

257001–257100 

|-bgcolor=#d6d6d6
| 257001 ||  || — || March 10, 2008 || Kitt Peak || Spacewatch || — || align=right | 3.2 km || 
|-id=002 bgcolor=#E9E9E9
| 257002 ||  || — || March 4, 2008 || Mount Lemmon || Mount Lemmon Survey || — || align=right | 2.1 km || 
|-id=003 bgcolor=#E9E9E9
| 257003 ||  || — || March 11, 2008 || Catalina || CSS || EUN || align=right | 2.0 km || 
|-id=004 bgcolor=#d6d6d6
| 257004 ||  || — || March 8, 2008 || Mount Lemmon || Mount Lemmon Survey || KAR || align=right | 1.2 km || 
|-id=005 bgcolor=#E9E9E9
| 257005 Arpadpal ||  ||  || March 11, 2008 || La Silla || EURONEAR || HOF || align=right | 3.1 km || 
|-id=006 bgcolor=#d6d6d6
| 257006 ||  || — || March 15, 2008 || Kitt Peak || Spacewatch || — || align=right | 3.4 km || 
|-id=007 bgcolor=#d6d6d6
| 257007 ||  || — || March 4, 2008 || Kitt Peak || Spacewatch || — || align=right | 4.8 km || 
|-id=008 bgcolor=#d6d6d6
| 257008 ||  || — || March 1, 2008 || Kitt Peak || Spacewatch || — || align=right | 2.8 km || 
|-id=009 bgcolor=#E9E9E9
| 257009 ||  || — || March 2, 2008 || Kitt Peak || Spacewatch || — || align=right | 2.3 km || 
|-id=010 bgcolor=#d6d6d6
| 257010 ||  || — || March 6, 2008 || Catalina || CSS || TIR || align=right | 7.5 km || 
|-id=011 bgcolor=#E9E9E9
| 257011 ||  || — || March 9, 2008 || Socorro || LINEAR || — || align=right | 1.5 km || 
|-id=012 bgcolor=#d6d6d6
| 257012 ||  || — || March 14, 2008 || Socorro || LINEAR || — || align=right | 5.3 km || 
|-id=013 bgcolor=#E9E9E9
| 257013 ||  || — || March 25, 2008 || Kitt Peak || Spacewatch || HOF || align=right | 2.7 km || 
|-id=014 bgcolor=#d6d6d6
| 257014 ||  || — || March 30, 2008 || Piszkéstető || K. Sárneczky || EUP || align=right | 4.2 km || 
|-id=015 bgcolor=#d6d6d6
| 257015 ||  || — || March 25, 2008 || Kitt Peak || Spacewatch || — || align=right | 3.6 km || 
|-id=016 bgcolor=#E9E9E9
| 257016 ||  || — || March 26, 2008 || Mount Lemmon || Mount Lemmon Survey || — || align=right | 1.1 km || 
|-id=017 bgcolor=#fefefe
| 257017 ||  || — || March 26, 2008 || Mount Lemmon || Mount Lemmon Survey || NYS || align=right data-sort-value="0.83" | 830 m || 
|-id=018 bgcolor=#E9E9E9
| 257018 ||  || — || March 26, 2008 || Mount Lemmon || Mount Lemmon Survey || — || align=right | 1.8 km || 
|-id=019 bgcolor=#d6d6d6
| 257019 ||  || — || March 26, 2008 || Mount Lemmon || Mount Lemmon Survey || — || align=right | 3.6 km || 
|-id=020 bgcolor=#E9E9E9
| 257020 ||  || — || March 27, 2008 || Kitt Peak || Spacewatch || — || align=right data-sort-value="0.94" | 940 m || 
|-id=021 bgcolor=#d6d6d6
| 257021 ||  || — || March 27, 2008 || Mount Lemmon || Mount Lemmon Survey || KOR || align=right | 1.7 km || 
|-id=022 bgcolor=#E9E9E9
| 257022 ||  || — || March 27, 2008 || Kitt Peak || Spacewatch || — || align=right | 1.2 km || 
|-id=023 bgcolor=#E9E9E9
| 257023 ||  || — || March 27, 2008 || Kitt Peak || Spacewatch || WIT || align=right | 1.5 km || 
|-id=024 bgcolor=#E9E9E9
| 257024 ||  || — || March 27, 2008 || Kitt Peak || Spacewatch || — || align=right | 2.2 km || 
|-id=025 bgcolor=#fefefe
| 257025 ||  || — || March 27, 2008 || Kitt Peak || Spacewatch || MAS || align=right data-sort-value="0.97" | 970 m || 
|-id=026 bgcolor=#E9E9E9
| 257026 ||  || — || March 27, 2008 || Mount Lemmon || Mount Lemmon Survey || — || align=right | 2.4 km || 
|-id=027 bgcolor=#fefefe
| 257027 ||  || — || March 28, 2008 || Mount Lemmon || Mount Lemmon Survey || NYS || align=right data-sort-value="0.66" | 660 m || 
|-id=028 bgcolor=#d6d6d6
| 257028 ||  || — || March 28, 2008 || Mount Lemmon || Mount Lemmon Survey || — || align=right | 3.6 km || 
|-id=029 bgcolor=#E9E9E9
| 257029 ||  || — || March 28, 2008 || Kitt Peak || Spacewatch || — || align=right | 1.2 km || 
|-id=030 bgcolor=#E9E9E9
| 257030 ||  || — || March 28, 2008 || Kitt Peak || Spacewatch || — || align=right | 1.5 km || 
|-id=031 bgcolor=#E9E9E9
| 257031 ||  || — || March 28, 2008 || Kitt Peak || Spacewatch || PAD || align=right | 3.5 km || 
|-id=032 bgcolor=#E9E9E9
| 257032 ||  || — || March 28, 2008 || Kitt Peak || Spacewatch || — || align=right | 2.8 km || 
|-id=033 bgcolor=#d6d6d6
| 257033 ||  || — || March 28, 2008 || Kitt Peak || Spacewatch || — || align=right | 4.2 km || 
|-id=034 bgcolor=#E9E9E9
| 257034 ||  || — || March 28, 2008 || Mount Lemmon || Mount Lemmon Survey || — || align=right | 2.3 km || 
|-id=035 bgcolor=#E9E9E9
| 257035 ||  || — || March 28, 2008 || Mount Lemmon || Mount Lemmon Survey || HEN || align=right | 1.3 km || 
|-id=036 bgcolor=#E9E9E9
| 257036 ||  || — || March 28, 2008 || Mount Lemmon || Mount Lemmon Survey || — || align=right | 1.9 km || 
|-id=037 bgcolor=#E9E9E9
| 257037 ||  || — || March 28, 2008 || Mount Lemmon || Mount Lemmon Survey || — || align=right | 1.7 km || 
|-id=038 bgcolor=#d6d6d6
| 257038 ||  || — || March 28, 2008 || Mount Lemmon || Mount Lemmon Survey || — || align=right | 3.6 km || 
|-id=039 bgcolor=#d6d6d6
| 257039 ||  || — || March 28, 2008 || Mount Lemmon || Mount Lemmon Survey || KOR || align=right | 1.7 km || 
|-id=040 bgcolor=#E9E9E9
| 257040 ||  || — || March 28, 2008 || Mount Lemmon || Mount Lemmon Survey || AST || align=right | 3.0 km || 
|-id=041 bgcolor=#d6d6d6
| 257041 ||  || — || March 28, 2008 || Mount Lemmon || Mount Lemmon Survey || — || align=right | 4.8 km || 
|-id=042 bgcolor=#d6d6d6
| 257042 ||  || — || March 28, 2008 || Kitt Peak || Spacewatch || — || align=right | 2.6 km || 
|-id=043 bgcolor=#d6d6d6
| 257043 ||  || — || March 28, 2008 || Kitt Peak || Spacewatch || VER || align=right | 4.6 km || 
|-id=044 bgcolor=#d6d6d6
| 257044 ||  || — || March 28, 2008 || Mount Lemmon || Mount Lemmon Survey || — || align=right | 3.3 km || 
|-id=045 bgcolor=#E9E9E9
| 257045 ||  || — || March 28, 2008 || Mount Lemmon || Mount Lemmon Survey || — || align=right | 1.1 km || 
|-id=046 bgcolor=#d6d6d6
| 257046 ||  || — || March 31, 2008 || Catalina || CSS || MEL || align=right | 5.9 km || 
|-id=047 bgcolor=#d6d6d6
| 257047 ||  || — || March 27, 2008 || Mount Lemmon || Mount Lemmon Survey || — || align=right | 2.7 km || 
|-id=048 bgcolor=#E9E9E9
| 257048 ||  || — || March 27, 2008 || Mount Lemmon || Mount Lemmon Survey || HOF || align=right | 3.1 km || 
|-id=049 bgcolor=#d6d6d6
| 257049 ||  || — || March 27, 2008 || Mount Lemmon || Mount Lemmon Survey || KAR || align=right | 1.3 km || 
|-id=050 bgcolor=#d6d6d6
| 257050 ||  || — || March 27, 2008 || Mount Lemmon || Mount Lemmon Survey || — || align=right | 3.1 km || 
|-id=051 bgcolor=#E9E9E9
| 257051 ||  || — || March 27, 2008 || Mount Lemmon || Mount Lemmon Survey || — || align=right | 3.0 km || 
|-id=052 bgcolor=#d6d6d6
| 257052 ||  || — || March 27, 2008 || Mount Lemmon || Mount Lemmon Survey || — || align=right | 3.6 km || 
|-id=053 bgcolor=#E9E9E9
| 257053 ||  || — || March 28, 2008 || Mount Lemmon || Mount Lemmon Survey || — || align=right | 2.1 km || 
|-id=054 bgcolor=#E9E9E9
| 257054 ||  || — || March 28, 2008 || Mount Lemmon || Mount Lemmon Survey || — || align=right | 1.3 km || 
|-id=055 bgcolor=#d6d6d6
| 257055 ||  || — || March 28, 2008 || Mount Lemmon || Mount Lemmon Survey || THM || align=right | 3.2 km || 
|-id=056 bgcolor=#d6d6d6
| 257056 ||  || — || March 28, 2008 || Mount Lemmon || Mount Lemmon Survey || — || align=right | 2.6 km || 
|-id=057 bgcolor=#d6d6d6
| 257057 ||  || — || March 28, 2008 || Kitt Peak || Spacewatch || — || align=right | 3.3 km || 
|-id=058 bgcolor=#E9E9E9
| 257058 ||  || — || March 29, 2008 || Kitt Peak || Spacewatch || — || align=right | 2.2 km || 
|-id=059 bgcolor=#d6d6d6
| 257059 ||  || — || March 29, 2008 || Kitt Peak || Spacewatch || — || align=right | 3.4 km || 
|-id=060 bgcolor=#E9E9E9
| 257060 ||  || — || March 29, 2008 || Kitt Peak || Spacewatch || PAD || align=right | 1.9 km || 
|-id=061 bgcolor=#E9E9E9
| 257061 ||  || — || March 29, 2008 || Catalina || CSS || GEF || align=right | 2.1 km || 
|-id=062 bgcolor=#d6d6d6
| 257062 ||  || — || March 30, 2008 || Kitt Peak || Spacewatch || VER || align=right | 4.6 km || 
|-id=063 bgcolor=#E9E9E9
| 257063 ||  || — || March 30, 2008 || Kitt Peak || Spacewatch || EUN || align=right | 1.9 km || 
|-id=064 bgcolor=#d6d6d6
| 257064 ||  || — || March 30, 2008 || Kitt Peak || Spacewatch || — || align=right | 2.7 km || 
|-id=065 bgcolor=#fefefe
| 257065 ||  || — || March 30, 2008 || Kitt Peak || Spacewatch || — || align=right | 1.2 km || 
|-id=066 bgcolor=#d6d6d6
| 257066 ||  || — || March 31, 2008 || Kitt Peak || Spacewatch || — || align=right | 5.2 km || 
|-id=067 bgcolor=#d6d6d6
| 257067 ||  || — || March 31, 2008 || Kitt Peak || Spacewatch || — || align=right | 7.0 km || 
|-id=068 bgcolor=#E9E9E9
| 257068 ||  || — || March 31, 2008 || Kitt Peak || Spacewatch || AST || align=right | 2.7 km || 
|-id=069 bgcolor=#d6d6d6
| 257069 ||  || — || March 31, 2008 || Kitt Peak || Spacewatch || KAR || align=right | 1.3 km || 
|-id=070 bgcolor=#E9E9E9
| 257070 ||  || — || March 31, 2008 || Kitt Peak || Spacewatch || MAR || align=right | 1.2 km || 
|-id=071 bgcolor=#d6d6d6
| 257071 ||  || — || March 31, 2008 || Kitt Peak || Spacewatch || THM || align=right | 3.0 km || 
|-id=072 bgcolor=#E9E9E9
| 257072 ||  || — || March 31, 2008 || Mount Lemmon || Mount Lemmon Survey || AGN || align=right | 1.6 km || 
|-id=073 bgcolor=#d6d6d6
| 257073 ||  || — || March 31, 2008 || Kitt Peak || Spacewatch || — || align=right | 3.6 km || 
|-id=074 bgcolor=#d6d6d6
| 257074 ||  || — || March 31, 2008 || Kitt Peak || Spacewatch || HYG || align=right | 5.1 km || 
|-id=075 bgcolor=#E9E9E9
| 257075 ||  || — || March 31, 2008 || Mount Lemmon || Mount Lemmon Survey || HOF || align=right | 3.7 km || 
|-id=076 bgcolor=#d6d6d6
| 257076 ||  || — || March 28, 2008 || Kitt Peak || Spacewatch || — || align=right | 3.2 km || 
|-id=077 bgcolor=#E9E9E9
| 257077 ||  || — || March 31, 2008 || Kitt Peak || Spacewatch || HOF || align=right | 3.6 km || 
|-id=078 bgcolor=#d6d6d6
| 257078 ||  || — || March 28, 2008 || Mount Lemmon || Mount Lemmon Survey || — || align=right | 4.7 km || 
|-id=079 bgcolor=#d6d6d6
| 257079 ||  || — || March 28, 2008 || Mount Lemmon || Mount Lemmon Survey || — || align=right | 3.6 km || 
|-id=080 bgcolor=#E9E9E9
| 257080 ||  || — || March 31, 2008 || Mount Lemmon || Mount Lemmon Survey || XIZ || align=right | 1.9 km || 
|-id=081 bgcolor=#d6d6d6
| 257081 ||  || — || March 31, 2008 || Kitt Peak || Spacewatch || — || align=right | 2.7 km || 
|-id=082 bgcolor=#E9E9E9
| 257082 ||  || — || March 30, 2008 || Catalina || CSS || — || align=right | 3.9 km || 
|-id=083 bgcolor=#E9E9E9
| 257083 ||  || — || March 31, 2008 || Catalina || CSS || — || align=right | 1.6 km || 
|-id=084 bgcolor=#d6d6d6
| 257084 ||  || — || April 5, 2008 || Costitx || OAM Obs. || — || align=right | 4.2 km || 
|-id=085 bgcolor=#E9E9E9
| 257085 ||  || — || April 6, 2008 || Desert Moon || B. L. Stevens || — || align=right | 2.9 km || 
|-id=086 bgcolor=#E9E9E9
| 257086 ||  || — || April 7, 2008 || Catalina || CSS || — || align=right | 2.8 km || 
|-id=087 bgcolor=#E9E9E9
| 257087 ||  || — || April 3, 2008 || Kitt Peak || Spacewatch || — || align=right | 2.7 km || 
|-id=088 bgcolor=#d6d6d6
| 257088 ||  || — || April 7, 2008 || Mayhill || W. G. Dillon || — || align=right | 4.8 km || 
|-id=089 bgcolor=#E9E9E9
| 257089 ||  || — || April 1, 2008 || Mount Lemmon || Mount Lemmon Survey || — || align=right | 3.2 km || 
|-id=090 bgcolor=#E9E9E9
| 257090 ||  || — || April 3, 2008 || Kitt Peak || Spacewatch || PAD || align=right | 2.0 km || 
|-id=091 bgcolor=#d6d6d6
| 257091 ||  || — || April 3, 2008 || Kitt Peak || Spacewatch || HYG || align=right | 3.8 km || 
|-id=092 bgcolor=#d6d6d6
| 257092 ||  || — || April 3, 2008 || Mount Lemmon || Mount Lemmon Survey || KOR || align=right | 1.5 km || 
|-id=093 bgcolor=#d6d6d6
| 257093 ||  || — || April 3, 2008 || Kitt Peak || Spacewatch || — || align=right | 3.2 km || 
|-id=094 bgcolor=#E9E9E9
| 257094 ||  || — || April 3, 2008 || Mount Lemmon || Mount Lemmon Survey || — || align=right | 2.6 km || 
|-id=095 bgcolor=#E9E9E9
| 257095 ||  || — || April 4, 2008 || Kitt Peak || Spacewatch || — || align=right | 1.9 km || 
|-id=096 bgcolor=#d6d6d6
| 257096 ||  || — || April 4, 2008 || Kitt Peak || Spacewatch || — || align=right | 4.8 km || 
|-id=097 bgcolor=#d6d6d6
| 257097 ||  || — || April 4, 2008 || Mount Lemmon || Mount Lemmon Survey || HYG || align=right | 3.9 km || 
|-id=098 bgcolor=#d6d6d6
| 257098 ||  || — || April 4, 2008 || Mount Lemmon || Mount Lemmon Survey || VER || align=right | 5.7 km || 
|-id=099 bgcolor=#d6d6d6
| 257099 ||  || — || April 4, 2008 || Kitt Peak || Spacewatch || — || align=right | 5.1 km || 
|-id=100 bgcolor=#d6d6d6
| 257100 ||  || — || April 4, 2008 || Kitt Peak || Spacewatch || — || align=right | 4.1 km || 
|}

257101–257200 

|-bgcolor=#E9E9E9
| 257101 ||  || — || April 4, 2008 || Kitt Peak || Spacewatch || — || align=right | 2.0 km || 
|-id=102 bgcolor=#E9E9E9
| 257102 ||  || — || April 5, 2008 || Kitt Peak || Spacewatch || NEM || align=right | 3.7 km || 
|-id=103 bgcolor=#d6d6d6
| 257103 ||  || — || April 5, 2008 || Mount Lemmon || Mount Lemmon Survey || — || align=right | 4.4 km || 
|-id=104 bgcolor=#fefefe
| 257104 ||  || — || April 5, 2008 || Mount Lemmon || Mount Lemmon Survey || — || align=right data-sort-value="0.76" | 760 m || 
|-id=105 bgcolor=#E9E9E9
| 257105 ||  || — || April 5, 2008 || Catalina || CSS || — || align=right | 2.9 km || 
|-id=106 bgcolor=#E9E9E9
| 257106 ||  || — || April 5, 2008 || Catalina || CSS || HOF || align=right | 5.6 km || 
|-id=107 bgcolor=#E9E9E9
| 257107 ||  || — || April 5, 2008 || Kitt Peak || Spacewatch || — || align=right | 1.3 km || 
|-id=108 bgcolor=#d6d6d6
| 257108 ||  || — || April 6, 2008 || Kitt Peak || Spacewatch || EOS || align=right | 2.3 km || 
|-id=109 bgcolor=#d6d6d6
| 257109 ||  || — || April 6, 2008 || Kitt Peak || Spacewatch || — || align=right | 3.9 km || 
|-id=110 bgcolor=#E9E9E9
| 257110 ||  || — || April 7, 2008 || Kitt Peak || Spacewatch || — || align=right | 3.0 km || 
|-id=111 bgcolor=#d6d6d6
| 257111 ||  || — || April 7, 2008 || Mount Lemmon || Mount Lemmon Survey || KAR || align=right | 1.1 km || 
|-id=112 bgcolor=#d6d6d6
| 257112 ||  || — || April 7, 2008 || Mount Lemmon || Mount Lemmon Survey || — || align=right | 3.3 km || 
|-id=113 bgcolor=#d6d6d6
| 257113 ||  || — || April 7, 2008 || Kitt Peak || Spacewatch || — || align=right | 4.1 km || 
|-id=114 bgcolor=#E9E9E9
| 257114 ||  || — || April 7, 2008 || Kitt Peak || Spacewatch || — || align=right | 2.6 km || 
|-id=115 bgcolor=#fefefe
| 257115 ||  || — || April 7, 2008 || Kitt Peak || Spacewatch || — || align=right | 3.0 km || 
|-id=116 bgcolor=#d6d6d6
| 257116 ||  || — || April 7, 2008 || Kitt Peak || Spacewatch || — || align=right | 3.8 km || 
|-id=117 bgcolor=#d6d6d6
| 257117 ||  || — || April 7, 2008 || Kitt Peak || Spacewatch || — || align=right | 3.8 km || 
|-id=118 bgcolor=#d6d6d6
| 257118 ||  || — || April 8, 2008 || Bergisch Gladbach || W. Bickel || — || align=right | 4.8 km || 
|-id=119 bgcolor=#E9E9E9
| 257119 ||  || — || April 9, 2008 || Kitt Peak || Spacewatch || — || align=right | 2.4 km || 
|-id=120 bgcolor=#E9E9E9
| 257120 ||  || — || April 5, 2008 || Mount Lemmon || Mount Lemmon Survey || WIT || align=right | 1.1 km || 
|-id=121 bgcolor=#d6d6d6
| 257121 ||  || — || April 5, 2008 || Catalina || CSS || — || align=right | 4.5 km || 
|-id=122 bgcolor=#d6d6d6
| 257122 ||  || — || April 6, 2008 || Kitt Peak || Spacewatch || — || align=right | 2.9 km || 
|-id=123 bgcolor=#E9E9E9
| 257123 ||  || — || April 8, 2008 || Mount Lemmon || Mount Lemmon Survey || — || align=right | 1.9 km || 
|-id=124 bgcolor=#d6d6d6
| 257124 ||  || — || April 8, 2008 || Kitt Peak || Spacewatch || — || align=right | 3.9 km || 
|-id=125 bgcolor=#E9E9E9
| 257125 ||  || — || April 10, 2008 || Kitt Peak || Spacewatch || — || align=right | 2.0 km || 
|-id=126 bgcolor=#d6d6d6
| 257126 ||  || — || April 11, 2008 || Mount Lemmon || Mount Lemmon Survey || KOR || align=right | 1.6 km || 
|-id=127 bgcolor=#d6d6d6
| 257127 ||  || — || April 11, 2008 || Kitt Peak || Spacewatch || EOS || align=right | 3.3 km || 
|-id=128 bgcolor=#d6d6d6
| 257128 ||  || — || April 11, 2008 || Kitt Peak || Spacewatch || — || align=right | 3.1 km || 
|-id=129 bgcolor=#d6d6d6
| 257129 ||  || — || April 11, 2008 || Mount Lemmon || Mount Lemmon Survey || — || align=right | 3.4 km || 
|-id=130 bgcolor=#E9E9E9
| 257130 ||  || — || April 12, 2008 || Catalina || CSS || — || align=right | 2.5 km || 
|-id=131 bgcolor=#E9E9E9
| 257131 ||  || — || April 13, 2008 || Kitt Peak || Spacewatch || HOF || align=right | 3.2 km || 
|-id=132 bgcolor=#E9E9E9
| 257132 ||  || — || April 13, 2008 || Kitt Peak || Spacewatch || — || align=right | 1.5 km || 
|-id=133 bgcolor=#d6d6d6
| 257133 ||  || — || April 5, 2008 || Kitt Peak || Spacewatch || — || align=right | 3.0 km || 
|-id=134 bgcolor=#d6d6d6
| 257134 ||  || — || April 15, 2008 || Kitt Peak || Spacewatch || — || align=right | 3.7 km || 
|-id=135 bgcolor=#E9E9E9
| 257135 ||  || — || April 1, 2008 || Kitt Peak || Spacewatch || HOF || align=right | 3.2 km || 
|-id=136 bgcolor=#E9E9E9
| 257136 ||  || — || April 4, 2008 || Catalina || CSS || GEF || align=right | 1.9 km || 
|-id=137 bgcolor=#d6d6d6
| 257137 ||  || — || April 4, 2008 || Socorro || LINEAR || — || align=right | 4.6 km || 
|-id=138 bgcolor=#d6d6d6
| 257138 ||  || — || April 24, 2008 || Kitt Peak || Spacewatch || — || align=right | 2.4 km || 
|-id=139 bgcolor=#E9E9E9
| 257139 ||  || — || April 26, 2008 || Bergisch Gladbac || W. Bickel || — || align=right | 1.5 km || 
|-id=140 bgcolor=#d6d6d6
| 257140 ||  || — || April 28, 2008 || La Sagra || OAM Obs. || EOS || align=right | 2.9 km || 
|-id=141 bgcolor=#E9E9E9
| 257141 ||  || — || April 24, 2008 || Kitt Peak || Spacewatch || — || align=right | 2.9 km || 
|-id=142 bgcolor=#E9E9E9
| 257142 ||  || — || April 24, 2008 || Kitt Peak || Spacewatch || — || align=right | 2.8 km || 
|-id=143 bgcolor=#E9E9E9
| 257143 ||  || — || April 24, 2008 || Kitt Peak || Spacewatch || — || align=right | 2.6 km || 
|-id=144 bgcolor=#d6d6d6
| 257144 ||  || — || April 24, 2008 || Mount Lemmon || Mount Lemmon Survey || KOR || align=right | 1.8 km || 
|-id=145 bgcolor=#d6d6d6
| 257145 ||  || — || April 24, 2008 || Mount Lemmon || Mount Lemmon Survey || THM || align=right | 2.8 km || 
|-id=146 bgcolor=#d6d6d6
| 257146 ||  || — || April 25, 2008 || Kitt Peak || Spacewatch || — || align=right | 3.8 km || 
|-id=147 bgcolor=#d6d6d6
| 257147 ||  || — || April 25, 2008 || Kitt Peak || Spacewatch || — || align=right | 2.8 km || 
|-id=148 bgcolor=#d6d6d6
| 257148 ||  || — || April 25, 2008 || Kitt Peak || Spacewatch || 7:4 || align=right | 4.2 km || 
|-id=149 bgcolor=#d6d6d6
| 257149 ||  || — || April 25, 2008 || Kitt Peak || Spacewatch || EOS || align=right | 2.6 km || 
|-id=150 bgcolor=#d6d6d6
| 257150 ||  || — || April 25, 2008 || Kitt Peak || Spacewatch || — || align=right | 5.1 km || 
|-id=151 bgcolor=#E9E9E9
| 257151 ||  || — || April 26, 2008 || Mount Lemmon || Mount Lemmon Survey || GEF || align=right | 1.7 km || 
|-id=152 bgcolor=#d6d6d6
| 257152 ||  || — || April 26, 2008 || Kitt Peak || Spacewatch || — || align=right | 2.9 km || 
|-id=153 bgcolor=#d6d6d6
| 257153 ||  || — || April 27, 2008 || Mount Lemmon || Mount Lemmon Survey || — || align=right | 3.7 km || 
|-id=154 bgcolor=#d6d6d6
| 257154 ||  || — || April 25, 2008 || Kitt Peak || Spacewatch || VER || align=right | 4.1 km || 
|-id=155 bgcolor=#d6d6d6
| 257155 ||  || — || April 30, 2008 || Mount Lemmon || Mount Lemmon Survey || THM || align=right | 2.7 km || 
|-id=156 bgcolor=#E9E9E9
| 257156 ||  || — || April 29, 2008 || Vicques || M. Ory || — || align=right | 1.9 km || 
|-id=157 bgcolor=#d6d6d6
| 257157 ||  || — || April 25, 2008 || Mount Lemmon || Mount Lemmon Survey || VER || align=right | 4.9 km || 
|-id=158 bgcolor=#E9E9E9
| 257158 ||  || — || April 26, 2008 || Mount Lemmon || Mount Lemmon Survey || — || align=right | 2.1 km || 
|-id=159 bgcolor=#d6d6d6
| 257159 ||  || — || April 27, 2008 || Mount Lemmon || Mount Lemmon Survey || — || align=right | 2.9 km || 
|-id=160 bgcolor=#E9E9E9
| 257160 ||  || — || April 27, 2008 || Mount Lemmon || Mount Lemmon Survey || MRX || align=right | 1.2 km || 
|-id=161 bgcolor=#d6d6d6
| 257161 ||  || — || April 29, 2008 || Kitt Peak || Spacewatch || EOS || align=right | 2.6 km || 
|-id=162 bgcolor=#E9E9E9
| 257162 ||  || — || April 30, 2008 || Kitt Peak || Spacewatch || — || align=right | 2.0 km || 
|-id=163 bgcolor=#E9E9E9
| 257163 ||  || — || April 30, 2008 || Mount Lemmon || Mount Lemmon Survey || — || align=right | 2.3 km || 
|-id=164 bgcolor=#E9E9E9
| 257164 ||  || — || April 30, 2008 || Mount Lemmon || Mount Lemmon Survey || HEN || align=right | 1.3 km || 
|-id=165 bgcolor=#d6d6d6
| 257165 ||  || — || April 29, 2008 || Mount Lemmon || Mount Lemmon Survey || EOS || align=right | 2.2 km || 
|-id=166 bgcolor=#E9E9E9
| 257166 ||  || — || April 29, 2008 || Catalina || CSS || HNS || align=right | 1.8 km || 
|-id=167 bgcolor=#E9E9E9
| 257167 ||  || — || April 30, 2008 || Catalina || CSS || — || align=right | 1.6 km || 
|-id=168 bgcolor=#E9E9E9
| 257168 ||  || — || April 24, 2008 || Mount Lemmon || Mount Lemmon Survey || — || align=right | 1.8 km || 
|-id=169 bgcolor=#d6d6d6
| 257169 ||  || — || April 29, 2008 || Mount Lemmon || Mount Lemmon Survey || — || align=right | 3.8 km || 
|-id=170 bgcolor=#d6d6d6
| 257170 ||  || — || May 1, 2008 || Mount Lemmon || Mount Lemmon Survey || — || align=right | 3.8 km || 
|-id=171 bgcolor=#d6d6d6
| 257171 ||  || — || May 2, 2008 || Mount Lemmon || Mount Lemmon Survey || — || align=right | 2.4 km || 
|-id=172 bgcolor=#E9E9E9
| 257172 ||  || — || May 2, 2008 || Kitt Peak || Spacewatch || EUN || align=right | 1.6 km || 
|-id=173 bgcolor=#C2FFFF
| 257173 ||  || — || May 3, 2008 || Kitt Peak || Spacewatch || L5 || align=right | 12 km || 
|-id=174 bgcolor=#E9E9E9
| 257174 ||  || — || May 6, 2008 || Kitt Peak || Spacewatch || EUN || align=right | 1.3 km || 
|-id=175 bgcolor=#d6d6d6
| 257175 ||  || — || May 7, 2008 || Kitt Peak || Spacewatch || — || align=right | 4.0 km || 
|-id=176 bgcolor=#E9E9E9
| 257176 ||  || — || May 8, 2008 || Kitt Peak || Spacewatch || — || align=right | 2.8 km || 
|-id=177 bgcolor=#d6d6d6
| 257177 ||  || — || May 8, 2008 || Kitt Peak || Spacewatch || — || align=right | 5.3 km || 
|-id=178 bgcolor=#d6d6d6
| 257178 ||  || — || May 11, 2008 || Catalina || CSS || URS || align=right | 4.5 km || 
|-id=179 bgcolor=#d6d6d6
| 257179 ||  || — || May 11, 2008 || Kitt Peak || Spacewatch || EOS || align=right | 5.3 km || 
|-id=180 bgcolor=#E9E9E9
| 257180 ||  || — || May 5, 2008 || Mount Lemmon || Mount Lemmon Survey || — || align=right | 1.9 km || 
|-id=181 bgcolor=#d6d6d6
| 257181 ||  || — || May 7, 2008 || Kitt Peak || Spacewatch || — || align=right | 3.7 km || 
|-id=182 bgcolor=#E9E9E9
| 257182 ||  || — || May 7, 2008 || Siding Spring || SSS || GER || align=right | 2.4 km || 
|-id=183 bgcolor=#d6d6d6
| 257183 ||  || — || May 7, 2008 || Kitt Peak || Spacewatch || EOS || align=right | 2.5 km || 
|-id=184 bgcolor=#d6d6d6
| 257184 ||  || — || May 26, 2008 || Kitt Peak || Spacewatch || — || align=right | 2.9 km || 
|-id=185 bgcolor=#d6d6d6
| 257185 ||  || — || May 26, 2008 || Kitt Peak || Spacewatch || — || align=right | 4.3 km || 
|-id=186 bgcolor=#d6d6d6
| 257186 ||  || — || May 27, 2008 || Kitt Peak || Spacewatch || — || align=right | 4.3 km || 
|-id=187 bgcolor=#d6d6d6
| 257187 ||  || — || May 27, 2008 || Mount Lemmon || Mount Lemmon Survey || — || align=right | 5.3 km || 
|-id=188 bgcolor=#d6d6d6
| 257188 ||  || — || May 29, 2008 || Kitt Peak || Spacewatch || — || align=right | 4.3 km || 
|-id=189 bgcolor=#d6d6d6
| 257189 ||  || — || May 28, 2008 || Calvin-Rehoboth || Calvin–Rehoboth Obs. || EOS || align=right | 2.5 km || 
|-id=190 bgcolor=#d6d6d6
| 257190 ||  || — || May 27, 2008 || Kitt Peak || Spacewatch || — || align=right | 3.1 km || 
|-id=191 bgcolor=#d6d6d6
| 257191 ||  || — || June 3, 2008 || Kitt Peak || Spacewatch || — || align=right | 3.5 km || 
|-id=192 bgcolor=#d6d6d6
| 257192 ||  || — || June 22, 2008 || Kitt Peak || Spacewatch || HYG || align=right | 5.0 km || 
|-id=193 bgcolor=#C2FFFF
| 257193 ||  || — || August 7, 2008 || Kitt Peak || Spacewatch || L4 || align=right | 10 km || 
|-id=194 bgcolor=#d6d6d6
| 257194 ||  || — || August 3, 2008 || Socorro || LINEAR || ARM || align=right | 5.4 km || 
|-id=195 bgcolor=#C2FFFF
| 257195 ||  || — || August 29, 2008 || Pises || Pises Obs. || L4 || align=right | 11 km || 
|-id=196 bgcolor=#C2FFFF
| 257196 ||  || — || September 2, 2008 || Kitt Peak || Spacewatch || L4 || align=right | 8.8 km || 
|-id=197 bgcolor=#C2FFFF
| 257197 ||  || — || September 2, 2008 || Kitt Peak || Spacewatch || L4 || align=right | 13 km || 
|-id=198 bgcolor=#C2FFFF
| 257198 ||  || — || September 3, 2008 || Kitt Peak || Spacewatch || L4 || align=right | 7.9 km || 
|-id=199 bgcolor=#C2FFFF
| 257199 ||  || — || September 3, 2008 || Kitt Peak || Spacewatch || L4 || align=right | 11 km || 
|-id=200 bgcolor=#C2FFFF
| 257200 ||  || — || September 4, 2008 || Kitt Peak || Spacewatch || L4 || align=right | 11 km || 
|}

257201–257300 

|-bgcolor=#C2FFFF
| 257201 ||  || — || September 4, 2008 || Kitt Peak || Spacewatch || L4 || align=right | 13 km || 
|-id=202 bgcolor=#C2FFFF
| 257202 ||  || — || September 5, 2008 || Kitt Peak || Spacewatch || L4 || align=right | 13 km || 
|-id=203 bgcolor=#C2FFFF
| 257203 ||  || — || September 5, 2008 || Kitt Peak || Spacewatch || L4 || align=right | 15 km || 
|-id=204 bgcolor=#C2FFFF
| 257204 ||  || — || September 25, 2008 || Kitt Peak || Spacewatch || L4 || align=right | 10 km || 
|-id=205 bgcolor=#C2FFFF
| 257205 ||  || — || October 2, 2008 || Mount Lemmon || Mount Lemmon Survey || L4 || align=right | 10 km || 
|-id=206 bgcolor=#C2FFFF
| 257206 || 2008 UA || — || October 18, 2008 || Sandlot || G. Hug || L4 || align=right | 15 km || 
|-id=207 bgcolor=#fefefe
| 257207 ||  || — || October 22, 2008 || Kitt Peak || Spacewatch || — || align=right | 1.1 km || 
|-id=208 bgcolor=#d6d6d6
| 257208 ||  || — || November 17, 2008 || Kitt Peak || Spacewatch || — || align=right | 3.7 km || 
|-id=209 bgcolor=#fefefe
| 257209 ||  || — || November 26, 2008 || La Sagra || OAM Obs. || H || align=right data-sort-value="0.75" | 750 m || 
|-id=210 bgcolor=#E9E9E9
| 257210 ||  || — || December 2, 2008 || Mount Lemmon || Mount Lemmon Survey || — || align=right | 3.9 km || 
|-id=211 bgcolor=#E9E9E9
| 257211 Kulizoli ||  ||  || December 21, 2008 || Piszkéstető || K. Sárneczky || — || align=right | 3.2 km || 
|-id=212 bgcolor=#E9E9E9
| 257212 Rózsahegyi ||  ||  || December 22, 2008 || Piszkéstető || K. Sárneczky || — || align=right | 1.5 km || 
|-id=213 bgcolor=#fefefe
| 257213 ||  || — || December 30, 2008 || Mount Lemmon || Mount Lemmon Survey || V || align=right data-sort-value="0.71" | 710 m || 
|-id=214 bgcolor=#d6d6d6
| 257214 ||  || — || January 2, 2009 || Mount Lemmon || Mount Lemmon Survey || EOS || align=right | 3.4 km || 
|-id=215 bgcolor=#fefefe
| 257215 ||  || — || January 3, 2009 || Kitt Peak || Spacewatch || — || align=right | 1.2 km || 
|-id=216 bgcolor=#E9E9E9
| 257216 ||  || — || January 2, 2009 || Kitt Peak || Spacewatch || — || align=right | 2.2 km || 
|-id=217 bgcolor=#E9E9E9
| 257217 ||  || — || January 2, 2009 || Catalina || CSS || — || align=right | 4.2 km || 
|-id=218 bgcolor=#fefefe
| 257218 ||  || — || January 30, 2009 || Mount Lemmon || Mount Lemmon Survey || NYS || align=right data-sort-value="0.80" | 800 m || 
|-id=219 bgcolor=#fefefe
| 257219 ||  || — || January 20, 2009 || Mount Lemmon || Mount Lemmon Survey || — || align=right | 1.0 km || 
|-id=220 bgcolor=#fefefe
| 257220 ||  || — || January 30, 2009 || Mount Lemmon || Mount Lemmon Survey || — || align=right data-sort-value="0.81" | 810 m || 
|-id=221 bgcolor=#fefefe
| 257221 ||  || — || February 1, 2009 || Kitt Peak || Spacewatch || — || align=right data-sort-value="0.71" | 710 m || 
|-id=222 bgcolor=#fefefe
| 257222 ||  || — || February 3, 2009 || Kitt Peak || Spacewatch || FLO || align=right data-sort-value="0.63" | 630 m || 
|-id=223 bgcolor=#fefefe
| 257223 ||  || — || February 3, 2009 || Mount Lemmon || Mount Lemmon Survey || NYS || align=right data-sort-value="0.92" | 920 m || 
|-id=224 bgcolor=#fefefe
| 257224 ||  || — || February 18, 2009 || Siding Spring || SSS || PHO || align=right | 1.7 km || 
|-id=225 bgcolor=#d6d6d6
| 257225 ||  || — || February 18, 2009 || Socorro || LINEAR || EUP || align=right | 4.9 km || 
|-id=226 bgcolor=#fefefe
| 257226 ||  || — || February 20, 2009 || Kitt Peak || Spacewatch || — || align=right | 1.4 km || 
|-id=227 bgcolor=#d6d6d6
| 257227 ||  || — || February 20, 2009 || Kitt Peak || Spacewatch || — || align=right | 6.2 km || 
|-id=228 bgcolor=#fefefe
| 257228 ||  || — || February 19, 2009 || Kitt Peak || Spacewatch || — || align=right | 1.5 km || 
|-id=229 bgcolor=#fefefe
| 257229 ||  || — || February 22, 2009 || Kitt Peak || Spacewatch || — || align=right | 3.2 km || 
|-id=230 bgcolor=#fefefe
| 257230 ||  || — || February 24, 2009 || Kitt Peak || Spacewatch || MAS || align=right | 1.1 km || 
|-id=231 bgcolor=#E9E9E9
| 257231 ||  || — || February 20, 2009 || Kitt Peak || Spacewatch || — || align=right | 2.4 km || 
|-id=232 bgcolor=#E9E9E9
| 257232 ||  || — || February 19, 2009 || Catalina || CSS || RAF || align=right | 1.3 km || 
|-id=233 bgcolor=#fefefe
| 257233 ||  || — || February 27, 2009 || Kitt Peak || Spacewatch || — || align=right | 1.2 km || 
|-id=234 bgcolor=#fefefe
| 257234 Güntherkurtze ||  ||  || February 26, 2009 || Calar Alto || F. Hormuth || — || align=right data-sort-value="0.92" | 920 m || 
|-id=235 bgcolor=#fefefe
| 257235 ||  || — || February 19, 2009 || Kitt Peak || Spacewatch || MAS || align=right data-sort-value="0.87" | 870 m || 
|-id=236 bgcolor=#fefefe
| 257236 ||  || — || February 19, 2009 || Kitt Peak || Spacewatch || — || align=right | 1.0 km || 
|-id=237 bgcolor=#fefefe
| 257237 ||  || — || February 19, 2009 || Kitt Peak || Spacewatch || — || align=right data-sort-value="0.91" | 910 m || 
|-id=238 bgcolor=#fefefe
| 257238 ||  || — || February 26, 2009 || Kitt Peak || Spacewatch || MAS || align=right data-sort-value="0.82" | 820 m || 
|-id=239 bgcolor=#d6d6d6
| 257239 ||  || — || March 15, 2009 || La Sagra || OAM Obs. || — || align=right | 5.4 km || 
|-id=240 bgcolor=#fefefe
| 257240 ||  || — || March 1, 2009 || Kitt Peak || Spacewatch || — || align=right | 2.4 km || 
|-id=241 bgcolor=#d6d6d6
| 257241 ||  || — || March 15, 2009 || Kitt Peak || Spacewatch || KAR || align=right | 1.3 km || 
|-id=242 bgcolor=#fefefe
| 257242 ||  || — || March 15, 2009 || Kitt Peak || Spacewatch || FLO || align=right data-sort-value="0.62" | 620 m || 
|-id=243 bgcolor=#fefefe
| 257243 ||  || — || March 14, 2009 || La Sagra || OAM Obs. || H || align=right data-sort-value="0.85" | 850 m || 
|-id=244 bgcolor=#fefefe
| 257244 ||  || — || March 15, 2009 || Kitt Peak || Spacewatch || — || align=right data-sort-value="0.79" | 790 m || 
|-id=245 bgcolor=#fefefe
| 257245 ||  || — || March 18, 2009 || Dauban || F. Kugel || — || align=right data-sort-value="0.86" | 860 m || 
|-id=246 bgcolor=#fefefe
| 257246 ||  || — || March 18, 2009 || La Sagra || OAM Obs. || — || align=right | 1.1 km || 
|-id=247 bgcolor=#E9E9E9
| 257247 ||  || — || March 20, 2009 || La Sagra || OAM Obs. || — || align=right | 2.3 km || 
|-id=248 bgcolor=#fefefe
| 257248 Chouchiehlun ||  ||  || March 20, 2009 || Lulin Observatory || Y.-S. Tsai, T. Chen || MAS || align=right data-sort-value="0.93" | 930 m || 
|-id=249 bgcolor=#fefefe
| 257249 ||  || — || March 17, 2009 || Bergisch Gladbac || W. Bickel || — || align=right data-sort-value="0.94" | 940 m || 
|-id=250 bgcolor=#fefefe
| 257250 ||  || — || March 18, 2009 || Kitt Peak || Spacewatch || — || align=right | 1.1 km || 
|-id=251 bgcolor=#E9E9E9
| 257251 ||  || — || March 22, 2009 || Vicques || M. Ory || — || align=right | 2.3 km || 
|-id=252 bgcolor=#fefefe
| 257252 ||  || — || March 17, 2009 || Kitt Peak || Spacewatch || — || align=right data-sort-value="0.82" | 820 m || 
|-id=253 bgcolor=#fefefe
| 257253 ||  || — || March 27, 2009 || La Sagra || OAM Obs. || H || align=right | 1.2 km || 
|-id=254 bgcolor=#E9E9E9
| 257254 ||  || — || March 24, 2009 || Socorro || LINEAR || — || align=right | 1.7 km || 
|-id=255 bgcolor=#fefefe
| 257255 ||  || — || March 21, 2009 || Kitt Peak || Spacewatch || — || align=right data-sort-value="0.89" | 890 m || 
|-id=256 bgcolor=#fefefe
| 257256 ||  || — || March 29, 2009 || Socorro || LINEAR || — || align=right | 1.2 km || 
|-id=257 bgcolor=#E9E9E9
| 257257 ||  || — || March 29, 2009 || Socorro || LINEAR || — || align=right | 1.7 km || 
|-id=258 bgcolor=#fefefe
| 257258 ||  || — || March 19, 2009 || Mount Lemmon || Mount Lemmon Survey || FLO || align=right data-sort-value="0.78" | 780 m || 
|-id=259 bgcolor=#fefefe
| 257259 ||  || — || March 27, 2009 || La Sagra || OAM Obs. || — || align=right data-sort-value="0.89" | 890 m || 
|-id=260 bgcolor=#fefefe
| 257260 ||  || — || March 27, 2009 || Kitt Peak || Spacewatch || — || align=right | 1.1 km || 
|-id=261 bgcolor=#fefefe
| 257261 Ovechkin ||  ||  || March 31, 2009 || Tzec Maun || L. Elenin || NYS || align=right | 1.9 km || 
|-id=262 bgcolor=#fefefe
| 257262 ||  || — || March 26, 2009 || Mount Lemmon || Mount Lemmon Survey || — || align=right data-sort-value="0.99" | 990 m || 
|-id=263 bgcolor=#fefefe
| 257263 ||  || — || March 21, 2009 || Kitt Peak || Spacewatch || — || align=right | 1.0 km || 
|-id=264 bgcolor=#fefefe
| 257264 ||  || — || March 21, 2009 || Kitt Peak || Spacewatch || FLO || align=right data-sort-value="0.71" | 710 m || 
|-id=265 bgcolor=#fefefe
| 257265 ||  || — || March 21, 2009 || Mount Lemmon || Mount Lemmon Survey || NYS || align=right data-sort-value="0.74" | 740 m || 
|-id=266 bgcolor=#E9E9E9
| 257266 ||  || — || March 28, 2009 || Siding Spring || SSS || ADE || align=right | 2.4 km || 
|-id=267 bgcolor=#E9E9E9
| 257267 ||  || — || March 24, 2009 || Kitt Peak || Spacewatch || — || align=right | 1.2 km || 
|-id=268 bgcolor=#E9E9E9
| 257268 ||  || — || March 24, 2009 || Kitt Peak || Spacewatch || GEF || align=right | 1.6 km || 
|-id=269 bgcolor=#fefefe
| 257269 ||  || — || March 29, 2009 || Kitt Peak || Spacewatch || — || align=right data-sort-value="0.74" | 740 m || 
|-id=270 bgcolor=#fefefe
| 257270 ||  || — || April 15, 2009 || Siding Spring || SSS || H || align=right data-sort-value="0.87" | 870 m || 
|-id=271 bgcolor=#E9E9E9
| 257271 ||  || — || April 2, 2009 || Kitt Peak || Spacewatch || — || align=right data-sort-value="0.97" | 970 m || 
|-id=272 bgcolor=#fefefe
| 257272 || 2009 HH || — || April 17, 2009 || Cordell-Lorenz || D. T. Durig || — || align=right | 1.5 km || 
|-id=273 bgcolor=#fefefe
| 257273 ||  || — || April 16, 2009 || Catalina || CSS || — || align=right | 1.0 km || 
|-id=274 bgcolor=#fefefe
| 257274 ||  || — || April 16, 2009 || Catalina || CSS || NYS || align=right data-sort-value="0.89" | 890 m || 
|-id=275 bgcolor=#fefefe
| 257275 ||  || — || April 17, 2009 || Kitt Peak || Spacewatch || — || align=right | 1.1 km || 
|-id=276 bgcolor=#fefefe
| 257276 ||  || — || April 17, 2009 || Catalina || CSS || FLO || align=right data-sort-value="0.80" | 800 m || 
|-id=277 bgcolor=#fefefe
| 257277 ||  || — || April 17, 2009 || Kitt Peak || Spacewatch || — || align=right | 1.1 km || 
|-id=278 bgcolor=#fefefe
| 257278 ||  || — || April 17, 2009 || Kitt Peak || Spacewatch || — || align=right | 1.1 km || 
|-id=279 bgcolor=#fefefe
| 257279 ||  || — || April 17, 2009 || Kitt Peak || Spacewatch || — || align=right | 1.1 km || 
|-id=280 bgcolor=#fefefe
| 257280 ||  || — || April 17, 2009 || Kitt Peak || Spacewatch || FLO || align=right data-sort-value="0.89" | 890 m || 
|-id=281 bgcolor=#E9E9E9
| 257281 ||  || — || April 19, 2009 || Catalina || CSS || — || align=right | 1.8 km || 
|-id=282 bgcolor=#fefefe
| 257282 ||  || — || April 16, 2009 || Catalina || CSS || — || align=right data-sort-value="0.97" | 970 m || 
|-id=283 bgcolor=#d6d6d6
| 257283 ||  || — || April 18, 2009 || Kitt Peak || Spacewatch || — || align=right | 2.4 km || 
|-id=284 bgcolor=#fefefe
| 257284 ||  || — || April 18, 2009 || Kitt Peak || Spacewatch || FLO || align=right data-sort-value="0.77" | 770 m || 
|-id=285 bgcolor=#fefefe
| 257285 ||  || — || April 16, 2009 || Catalina || CSS || — || align=right | 1.2 km || 
|-id=286 bgcolor=#fefefe
| 257286 ||  || — || April 18, 2009 || Kitt Peak || Spacewatch || — || align=right data-sort-value="0.87" | 870 m || 
|-id=287 bgcolor=#fefefe
| 257287 ||  || — || April 18, 2009 || Catalina || CSS || — || align=right data-sort-value="0.88" | 880 m || 
|-id=288 bgcolor=#E9E9E9
| 257288 ||  || — || April 19, 2009 || Kitt Peak || Spacewatch || — || align=right | 1.3 km || 
|-id=289 bgcolor=#E9E9E9
| 257289 ||  || — || April 17, 2009 || Catalina || CSS || EUN || align=right | 1.7 km || 
|-id=290 bgcolor=#fefefe
| 257290 ||  || — || April 20, 2009 || Kitt Peak || Spacewatch || V || align=right data-sort-value="0.87" | 870 m || 
|-id=291 bgcolor=#d6d6d6
| 257291 ||  || — || April 20, 2009 || Kitt Peak || Spacewatch || EUP || align=right | 4.9 km || 
|-id=292 bgcolor=#E9E9E9
| 257292 ||  || — || April 21, 2009 || La Sagra || OAM Obs. || — || align=right | 3.0 km || 
|-id=293 bgcolor=#fefefe
| 257293 ||  || — || April 21, 2009 || Kitt Peak || Spacewatch || — || align=right | 1.4 km || 
|-id=294 bgcolor=#fefefe
| 257294 ||  || — || April 20, 2009 || Kitt Peak || Spacewatch || — || align=right | 1.0 km || 
|-id=295 bgcolor=#fefefe
| 257295 ||  || — || April 21, 2009 || Mount Lemmon || Mount Lemmon Survey || NYS || align=right data-sort-value="0.71" | 710 m || 
|-id=296 bgcolor=#E9E9E9
| 257296 Jessicaamy ||  ||  || April 20, 2009 || Zadko || M. Todd || EUN || align=right | 1.6 km || 
|-id=297 bgcolor=#fefefe
| 257297 ||  || — || April 17, 2009 || Catalina || CSS || — || align=right | 1.2 km || 
|-id=298 bgcolor=#fefefe
| 257298 ||  || — || April 18, 2009 || Catalina || CSS || H || align=right | 1.2 km || 
|-id=299 bgcolor=#fefefe
| 257299 ||  || — || April 22, 2009 || Mount Lemmon || Mount Lemmon Survey || EUT || align=right data-sort-value="0.77" | 770 m || 
|-id=300 bgcolor=#fefefe
| 257300 ||  || — || April 20, 2009 || Mount Lemmon || Mount Lemmon Survey || MAS || align=right data-sort-value="0.78" | 780 m || 
|}

257301–257400 

|-bgcolor=#fefefe
| 257301 ||  || — || April 20, 2009 || Mount Lemmon || Mount Lemmon Survey || V || align=right data-sort-value="0.80" | 800 m || 
|-id=302 bgcolor=#fefefe
| 257302 ||  || — || April 20, 2009 || Mount Lemmon || Mount Lemmon Survey || — || align=right data-sort-value="0.98" | 980 m || 
|-id=303 bgcolor=#fefefe
| 257303 ||  || — || April 23, 2009 || Kitt Peak || Spacewatch || H || align=right data-sort-value="0.97" | 970 m || 
|-id=304 bgcolor=#E9E9E9
| 257304 ||  || — || April 21, 2009 || Mount Lemmon || Mount Lemmon Survey || — || align=right | 1.9 km || 
|-id=305 bgcolor=#fefefe
| 257305 ||  || — || April 22, 2009 || Mount Lemmon || Mount Lemmon Survey || — || align=right | 1.0 km || 
|-id=306 bgcolor=#E9E9E9
| 257306 ||  || — || April 28, 2009 || Catalina || CSS || BRU || align=right | 4.5 km || 
|-id=307 bgcolor=#fefefe
| 257307 ||  || — || April 28, 2009 || Catalina || CSS || NYS || align=right data-sort-value="0.85" | 850 m || 
|-id=308 bgcolor=#fefefe
| 257308 ||  || — || April 22, 2009 || La Sagra || OAM Obs. || NYS || align=right data-sort-value="0.79" | 790 m || 
|-id=309 bgcolor=#E9E9E9
| 257309 ||  || — || April 27, 2009 || Kitt Peak || Spacewatch || — || align=right | 1.5 km || 
|-id=310 bgcolor=#E9E9E9
| 257310 ||  || — || April 29, 2009 || Kitt Peak || Spacewatch || — || align=right | 1.2 km || 
|-id=311 bgcolor=#fefefe
| 257311 ||  || — || April 30, 2009 || La Sagra || OAM Obs. || ERI || align=right | 1.8 km || 
|-id=312 bgcolor=#fefefe
| 257312 ||  || — || April 22, 2009 || La Sagra || OAM Obs. || NYS || align=right data-sort-value="0.79" | 790 m || 
|-id=313 bgcolor=#fefefe
| 257313 ||  || — || April 23, 2009 || La Sagra || OAM Obs. || — || align=right | 1.2 km || 
|-id=314 bgcolor=#fefefe
| 257314 ||  || — || April 24, 2009 || Cerro Burek || Alianza S4 Obs. || V || align=right data-sort-value="0.89" | 890 m || 
|-id=315 bgcolor=#d6d6d6
| 257315 ||  || — || April 29, 2009 || Kitt Peak || Spacewatch || — || align=right | 4.1 km || 
|-id=316 bgcolor=#fefefe
| 257316 ||  || — || April 19, 2009 || Mount Lemmon || Mount Lemmon Survey || — || align=right | 1.0 km || 
|-id=317 bgcolor=#E9E9E9
| 257317 ||  || — || April 20, 2009 || Mount Lemmon || Mount Lemmon Survey || — || align=right | 1.2 km || 
|-id=318 bgcolor=#fefefe
| 257318 ||  || — || April 29, 2009 || Kitt Peak || Spacewatch || — || align=right | 1.2 km || 
|-id=319 bgcolor=#E9E9E9
| 257319 ||  || — || April 30, 2009 || Kitt Peak || Spacewatch || — || align=right | 1.1 km || 
|-id=320 bgcolor=#fefefe
| 257320 ||  || — || April 26, 2009 || Moletai || K. Černis, J. Zdanavičius || V || align=right data-sort-value="0.88" | 880 m || 
|-id=321 bgcolor=#fefefe
| 257321 ||  || — || April 21, 2009 || Mount Lemmon || Mount Lemmon Survey || — || align=right data-sort-value="0.99" | 990 m || 
|-id=322 bgcolor=#E9E9E9
| 257322 ||  || — || April 17, 2009 || Kitt Peak || Spacewatch || — || align=right | 2.4 km || 
|-id=323 bgcolor=#d6d6d6
| 257323 ||  || — || April 19, 2009 || Kitt Peak || Spacewatch || — || align=right | 2.6 km || 
|-id=324 bgcolor=#fefefe
| 257324 ||  || — || April 28, 2009 || Mount Lemmon || Mount Lemmon Survey || — || align=right | 1.0 km || 
|-id=325 bgcolor=#fefefe
| 257325 ||  || — || April 21, 2009 || Kitt Peak || Spacewatch || V || align=right data-sort-value="0.84" | 840 m || 
|-id=326 bgcolor=#d6d6d6
| 257326 ||  || — || April 26, 2009 || Kitt Peak || Spacewatch || EOS || align=right | 2.5 km || 
|-id=327 bgcolor=#fefefe
| 257327 ||  || — || April 22, 2009 || Mount Lemmon || Mount Lemmon Survey || V || align=right data-sort-value="0.89" | 890 m || 
|-id=328 bgcolor=#fefefe
| 257328 ||  || — || April 23, 2009 || Kitt Peak || Spacewatch || — || align=right | 1.2 km || 
|-id=329 bgcolor=#fefefe
| 257329 ||  || — || April 21, 2009 || Kitt Peak || Spacewatch || — || align=right data-sort-value="0.78" | 780 m || 
|-id=330 bgcolor=#E9E9E9
| 257330 ||  || — || April 17, 2009 || Kitt Peak || Spacewatch || — || align=right | 2.1 km || 
|-id=331 bgcolor=#fefefe
| 257331 ||  || — || April 18, 2009 || Mount Lemmon || Mount Lemmon Survey || — || align=right data-sort-value="0.74" | 740 m || 
|-id=332 bgcolor=#E9E9E9
| 257332 ||  || — || April 19, 2009 || Kitt Peak || Spacewatch || MAR || align=right | 1.2 km || 
|-id=333 bgcolor=#E9E9E9
| 257333 ||  || — || April 16, 2009 || Siding Spring || SSS || EUN || align=right | 2.1 km || 
|-id=334 bgcolor=#E9E9E9
| 257334 ||  || — || May 2, 2009 || La Sagra || OAM Obs. || — || align=right | 2.5 km || 
|-id=335 bgcolor=#E9E9E9
| 257335 ||  || — || May 4, 2009 || La Sagra || OAM Obs. || — || align=right | 2.9 km || 
|-id=336 bgcolor=#d6d6d6
| 257336 Noeliasanchez ||  ||  || May 4, 2009 || La Sagra || OAM Obs. || EUP || align=right | 7.1 km || 
|-id=337 bgcolor=#d6d6d6
| 257337 ||  || — || May 14, 2009 || Kitt Peak || Spacewatch || — || align=right | 4.9 km || 
|-id=338 bgcolor=#E9E9E9
| 257338 ||  || — || May 14, 2009 || Mount Lemmon || Mount Lemmon Survey || — || align=right | 1.8 km || 
|-id=339 bgcolor=#fefefe
| 257339 ||  || — || May 2, 2009 || La Sagra || OAM Obs. || — || align=right | 1.0 km || 
|-id=340 bgcolor=#E9E9E9
| 257340 ||  || — || May 2, 2009 || La Sagra || OAM Obs. || — || align=right | 2.6 km || 
|-id=341 bgcolor=#d6d6d6
| 257341 ||  || — || May 1, 2009 || Mount Lemmon || Mount Lemmon Survey || HYG || align=right | 3.0 km || 
|-id=342 bgcolor=#E9E9E9
| 257342 ||  || — || May 4, 2009 || Mount Lemmon || Mount Lemmon Survey || HEN || align=right | 1.4 km || 
|-id=343 bgcolor=#fefefe
| 257343 ||  || — || May 1, 2009 || Mount Lemmon || Mount Lemmon Survey || V || align=right data-sort-value="0.75" | 750 m || 
|-id=344 bgcolor=#E9E9E9
| 257344 ||  || — || May 15, 2009 || Siding Spring || SSS || — || align=right | 3.1 km || 
|-id=345 bgcolor=#fefefe
| 257345 ||  || — || May 17, 2009 || La Sagra || OAM Obs. || FLO || align=right data-sort-value="0.87" | 870 m || 
|-id=346 bgcolor=#fefefe
| 257346 ||  || — || May 20, 2009 || Mayhill || A. Lowe || — || align=right | 1.1 km || 
|-id=347 bgcolor=#fefefe
| 257347 ||  || — || May 24, 2009 || Catalina || CSS || V || align=right data-sort-value="0.75" | 750 m || 
|-id=348 bgcolor=#fefefe
| 257348 ||  || — || May 26, 2009 || La Sagra || OAM Obs. || ERI || align=right | 1.9 km || 
|-id=349 bgcolor=#E9E9E9
| 257349 ||  || — || May 28, 2009 || La Sagra || OAM Obs. || — || align=right | 2.3 km || 
|-id=350 bgcolor=#fefefe
| 257350 ||  || — || May 28, 2009 || La Sagra || OAM Obs. || — || align=right | 1.1 km || 
|-id=351 bgcolor=#E9E9E9
| 257351 ||  || — || May 26, 2009 || Catalina || CSS || — || align=right | 1.4 km || 
|-id=352 bgcolor=#d6d6d6
| 257352 ||  || — || May 26, 2009 || Catalina || CSS || — || align=right | 4.1 km || 
|-id=353 bgcolor=#fefefe
| 257353 ||  || — || May 26, 2009 || Catalina || CSS || — || align=right | 2.6 km || 
|-id=354 bgcolor=#E9E9E9
| 257354 ||  || — || May 27, 2009 || Mount Lemmon || Mount Lemmon Survey || — || align=right | 1.8 km || 
|-id=355 bgcolor=#E9E9E9
| 257355 ||  || — || May 25, 2009 || Mount Lemmon || Mount Lemmon Survey || — || align=right | 2.9 km || 
|-id=356 bgcolor=#d6d6d6
| 257356 ||  || — || May 27, 2009 || Kitt Peak || Spacewatch || — || align=right | 4.3 km || 
|-id=357 bgcolor=#E9E9E9
| 257357 ||  || — || May 17, 2009 || Kitt Peak || Spacewatch || — || align=right | 1.4 km || 
|-id=358 bgcolor=#fefefe
| 257358 ||  || — || June 11, 2009 || La Sagra || OAM Obs. || — || align=right | 1.1 km || 
|-id=359 bgcolor=#E9E9E9
| 257359 ||  || — || June 14, 2009 || Kitt Peak || Spacewatch || — || align=right | 1.9 km || 
|-id=360 bgcolor=#d6d6d6
| 257360 ||  || — || June 17, 2009 || La Sagra || OAM Obs. || — || align=right | 5.3 km || 
|-id=361 bgcolor=#fefefe
| 257361 ||  || — || June 24, 2009 || La Sagra || OAM Obs. || — || align=right | 1.3 km || 
|-id=362 bgcolor=#E9E9E9
| 257362 ||  || — || June 27, 2009 || La Sagra || OAM Obs. || — || align=right | 1.5 km || 
|-id=363 bgcolor=#d6d6d6
| 257363 ||  || — || July 14, 2009 || Kitt Peak || Spacewatch || 7:4 || align=right | 6.0 km || 
|-id=364 bgcolor=#d6d6d6
| 257364 ||  || — || July 16, 2009 || La Sagra || OAM Obs. || — || align=right | 4.0 km || 
|-id=365 bgcolor=#fefefe
| 257365 ||  || — || July 19, 2009 || La Sagra || OAM Obs. || — || align=right | 2.5 km || 
|-id=366 bgcolor=#d6d6d6
| 257366 ||  || — || July 23, 2009 || Tiki || N. Teamo || URS || align=right | 5.4 km || 
|-id=367 bgcolor=#d6d6d6
| 257367 ||  || — || July 28, 2009 || Kitt Peak || Spacewatch || — || align=right | 2.8 km || 
|-id=368 bgcolor=#d6d6d6
| 257368 ||  || — || July 31, 2009 || Sandlot || G. Hug || — || align=right | 4.2 km || 
|-id=369 bgcolor=#d6d6d6
| 257369 ||  || — || July 27, 2009 || Kitt Peak || Spacewatch || — || align=right | 5.8 km || 
|-id=370 bgcolor=#d6d6d6
| 257370 ||  || — || July 27, 2009 || Catalina || CSS || URS || align=right | 5.2 km || 
|-id=371 bgcolor=#d6d6d6
| 257371 Miguelbello ||  ||  || August 14, 2009 || La Sagra || OAM Obs. || — || align=right | 4.5 km || 
|-id=372 bgcolor=#d6d6d6
| 257372 ||  || — || August 15, 2009 || Kachina || Kachina Obs. || EOS || align=right | 2.7 km || 
|-id=373 bgcolor=#d6d6d6
| 257373 ||  || — || August 1, 2009 || Siding Spring || SSS || LUT || align=right | 6.6 km || 
|-id=374 bgcolor=#d6d6d6
| 257374 ||  || — || August 16, 2009 || Kitt Peak || Spacewatch || 7:4 || align=right | 4.7 km || 
|-id=375 bgcolor=#C2FFFF
| 257375 ||  || — || August 28, 2009 || La Sagra || OAM Obs. || L4 || align=right | 14 km || 
|-id=376 bgcolor=#C2FFFF
| 257376 ||  || — || August 17, 2009 || Kitt Peak || Spacewatch || L4 || align=right | 10 km || 
|-id=377 bgcolor=#d6d6d6
| 257377 ||  || — || September 14, 2009 || Needville || C. Sexton, J. Dellinger || — || align=right | 3.8 km || 
|-id=378 bgcolor=#d6d6d6
| 257378 ||  || — || September 12, 2009 || Kitt Peak || Spacewatch || 3:2 || align=right | 5.2 km || 
|-id=379 bgcolor=#d6d6d6
| 257379 ||  || — || September 15, 2009 || Kitt Peak || Spacewatch || — || align=right | 3.6 km || 
|-id=380 bgcolor=#C2FFFF
| 257380 ||  || — || September 16, 2009 || Kitt Peak || Spacewatch || L4 || align=right | 11 km || 
|-id=381 bgcolor=#C2FFFF
| 257381 ||  || — || September 16, 2009 || Kitt Peak || Spacewatch || L4 || align=right | 8.5 km || 
|-id=382 bgcolor=#d6d6d6
| 257382 ||  || — || September 17, 2009 || Kitt Peak || Spacewatch || — || align=right | 4.0 km || 
|-id=383 bgcolor=#C2FFFF
| 257383 ||  || — || September 17, 2009 || Kitt Peak || Spacewatch || L4 || align=right | 11 km || 
|-id=384 bgcolor=#C2FFFF
| 257384 ||  || — || September 17, 2009 || Kitt Peak || Spacewatch || L4 || align=right | 10 km || 
|-id=385 bgcolor=#C2FFFF
| 257385 ||  || — || September 18, 2009 || Kitt Peak || Spacewatch || L4 || align=right | 11 km || 
|-id=386 bgcolor=#C2FFFF
| 257386 ||  || — || September 18, 2009 || Kitt Peak || Spacewatch || L4 || align=right | 13 km || 
|-id=387 bgcolor=#C2FFFF
| 257387 ||  || — || September 18, 2009 || Kitt Peak || Spacewatch || L4 || align=right | 9.1 km || 
|-id=388 bgcolor=#C2FFFF
| 257388 ||  || — || September 20, 2009 || Kitt Peak || Spacewatch || L4 || align=right | 8.9 km || 
|-id=389 bgcolor=#C2FFFF
| 257389 ||  || — || September 20, 2009 || Kitt Peak || Spacewatch || L4 || align=right | 11 km || 
|-id=390 bgcolor=#C2FFFF
| 257390 ||  || — || September 22, 2009 || Kitt Peak || Spacewatch || L4 || align=right | 9.0 km || 
|-id=391 bgcolor=#d6d6d6
| 257391 ||  || — || September 22, 2009 || Kitt Peak || Spacewatch || — || align=right | 4.8 km || 
|-id=392 bgcolor=#C2FFFF
| 257392 ||  || — || September 22, 2009 || Kitt Peak || Spacewatch || L4 || align=right | 12 km || 
|-id=393 bgcolor=#C2FFFF
| 257393 ||  || — || September 23, 2009 || Kitt Peak || Spacewatch || L4 || align=right | 9.6 km || 
|-id=394 bgcolor=#C2FFFF
| 257394 ||  || — || September 24, 2009 || Kitt Peak || Spacewatch || L4 || align=right | 9.0 km || 
|-id=395 bgcolor=#C2FFFF
| 257395 ||  || — || September 24, 2009 || Kitt Peak || Spacewatch || L4 || align=right | 14 km || 
|-id=396 bgcolor=#E9E9E9
| 257396 ||  || — || September 24, 2009 || Mount Lemmon || Mount Lemmon Survey || — || align=right | 3.2 km || 
|-id=397 bgcolor=#C2FFFF
| 257397 ||  || — || September 23, 2009 || Mount Lemmon || Mount Lemmon Survey || L4 || align=right | 12 km || 
|-id=398 bgcolor=#C2FFFF
| 257398 ||  || — || September 18, 2009 || Kitt Peak || Spacewatch || L4ARK || align=right | 10 km || 
|-id=399 bgcolor=#C2FFFF
| 257399 ||  || — || September 25, 2009 || Kitt Peak || Spacewatch || L4 || align=right | 16 km || 
|-id=400 bgcolor=#C2FFFF
| 257400 ||  || — || September 23, 2009 || Mount Lemmon || Mount Lemmon Survey || L4 || align=right | 13 km || 
|}

257401–257500 

|-bgcolor=#C2FFFF
| 257401 ||  || — || September 23, 2009 || Mount Lemmon || Mount Lemmon Survey || L4 || align=right | 14 km || 
|-id=402 bgcolor=#C2FFFF
| 257402 ||  || — || September 28, 2009 || Catalina || CSS || L4 || align=right | 17 km || 
|-id=403 bgcolor=#d6d6d6
| 257403 ||  || — || September 29, 2009 || Mount Lemmon || Mount Lemmon Survey || SYL7:4 || align=right | 5.7 km || 
|-id=404 bgcolor=#C2FFFF
| 257404 ||  || — || September 19, 2009 || Kitt Peak || Spacewatch || L4 || align=right | 13 km || 
|-id=405 bgcolor=#C2FFFF
| 257405 ||  || — || September 18, 2009 || Catalina || CSS || L4 || align=right | 20 km || 
|-id=406 bgcolor=#C2FFFF
| 257406 ||  || — || September 26, 2009 || Kitt Peak || Spacewatch || L4 || align=right | 13 km || 
|-id=407 bgcolor=#C2FFFF
| 257407 ||  || — || September 17, 2009 || Kitt Peak || Spacewatch || L4 || align=right | 9.8 km || 
|-id=408 bgcolor=#d6d6d6
| 257408 ||  || — || September 16, 2009 || Catalina || CSS || — || align=right | 5.6 km || 
|-id=409 bgcolor=#C2FFFF
| 257409 ||  || — || September 27, 2009 || Socorro || LINEAR || L4 || align=right | 11 km || 
|-id=410 bgcolor=#d6d6d6
| 257410 ||  || — || October 1, 2009 || Mount Lemmon || Mount Lemmon Survey || — || align=right | 4.7 km || 
|-id=411 bgcolor=#C2FFFF
| 257411 ||  || — || October 9, 2009 || Catalina || CSS || L4 || align=right | 15 km || 
|-id=412 bgcolor=#C2FFFF
| 257412 ||  || — || October 16, 2009 || Socorro || LINEAR || L4 || align=right | 15 km || 
|-id=413 bgcolor=#C2FFFF
| 257413 ||  || — || October 17, 2009 || Mount Lemmon || Mount Lemmon Survey || L4 || align=right | 13 km || 
|-id=414 bgcolor=#fefefe
| 257414 ||  || — || October 22, 2009 || Mount Lemmon || Mount Lemmon Survey || — || align=right data-sort-value="0.95" | 950 m || 
|-id=415 bgcolor=#C2FFFF
| 257415 ||  || — || October 23, 2009 || Mount Lemmon || Mount Lemmon Survey || L4 || align=right | 8.5 km || 
|-id=416 bgcolor=#C2FFFF
| 257416 ||  || — || October 16, 2009 || Mount Lemmon || Mount Lemmon Survey || L4 || align=right | 14 km || 
|-id=417 bgcolor=#d6d6d6
| 257417 || 2009 WT || — || November 16, 2009 || Calvin-Rehoboth || L. A. Molnar || — || align=right | 4.4 km || 
|-id=418 bgcolor=#C2FFFF
| 257418 ||  || — || November 16, 2009 || Mount Lemmon || Mount Lemmon Survey || L4 || align=right | 11 km || 
|-id=419 bgcolor=#E9E9E9
| 257419 ||  || — || December 26, 2009 || Kitt Peak || Spacewatch || MRX || align=right | 1.3 km || 
|-id=420 bgcolor=#d6d6d6
| 257420 ||  || — || December 18, 2009 || Mount Lemmon || Mount Lemmon Survey || EOS || align=right | 2.2 km || 
|-id=421 bgcolor=#d6d6d6
| 257421 ||  || — || January 16, 2010 || WISE || WISE || — || align=right | 4.3 km || 
|-id=422 bgcolor=#E9E9E9
| 257422 ||  || — || March 22, 2010 || ESA OGS || ESA OGS || DOR || align=right | 4.4 km || 
|-id=423 bgcolor=#fefefe
| 257423 ||  || — || March 22, 2010 || ESA OGS || ESA OGS || MAS || align=right data-sort-value="0.99" | 990 m || 
|-id=424 bgcolor=#d6d6d6
| 257424 ||  || — || April 29, 2010 || WISE || WISE || — || align=right | 3.1 km || 
|-id=425 bgcolor=#d6d6d6
| 257425 ||  || — || May 4, 2010 || WISE || WISE || — || align=right | 5.3 km || 
|-id=426 bgcolor=#fefefe
| 257426 ||  || — || May 28, 2010 || WISE || WISE || — || align=right | 1.8 km || 
|-id=427 bgcolor=#d6d6d6
| 257427 ||  || — || May 29, 2010 || WISE || WISE || TRP || align=right | 3.3 km || 
|-id=428 bgcolor=#d6d6d6
| 257428 ||  || — || June 6, 2010 || WISE || WISE || — || align=right | 3.6 km || 
|-id=429 bgcolor=#E9E9E9
| 257429 ||  || — || June 8, 2010 || WISE || WISE || DOR || align=right | 3.3 km || 
|-id=430 bgcolor=#d6d6d6
| 257430 ||  || — || June 12, 2010 || WISE || WISE || THB || align=right | 4.5 km || 
|-id=431 bgcolor=#d6d6d6
| 257431 ||  || — || June 15, 2010 || WISE || WISE || — || align=right | 5.8 km || 
|-id=432 bgcolor=#fefefe
| 257432 ||  || — || June 18, 2010 || Mount Lemmon || Mount Lemmon Survey || — || align=right | 1.8 km || 
|-id=433 bgcolor=#d6d6d6
| 257433 ||  || — || July 5, 2010 || Kitt Peak || Spacewatch || — || align=right | 4.1 km || 
|-id=434 bgcolor=#fefefe
| 257434 ||  || — || July 5, 2010 || Mount Lemmon || Mount Lemmon Survey || — || align=right data-sort-value="0.99" | 990 m || 
|-id=435 bgcolor=#E9E9E9
| 257435 ||  || — || July 8, 2010 || WISE || WISE || — || align=right | 3.3 km || 
|-id=436 bgcolor=#d6d6d6
| 257436 ||  || — || July 9, 2010 || WISE || WISE || — || align=right | 4.1 km || 
|-id=437 bgcolor=#E9E9E9
| 257437 ||  || — || July 14, 2010 || WISE || WISE || — || align=right | 2.1 km || 
|-id=438 bgcolor=#E9E9E9
| 257438 ||  || — || July 28, 2010 || WISE || WISE || — || align=right | 4.0 km || 
|-id=439 bgcolor=#E9E9E9
| 257439 Peppeprosperini ||  ||  || August 9, 2010 || Frasso Sabino || Frasso Sabino Obs. || — || align=right | 2.0 km || 
|-id=440 bgcolor=#d6d6d6
| 257440 ||  || — || August 10, 2010 || Kitt Peak || Spacewatch || — || align=right | 3.3 km || 
|-id=441 bgcolor=#E9E9E9
| 257441 ||  || — || August 19, 2010 || Purple Mountain || PMO NEO || — || align=right | 1.6 km || 
|-id=442 bgcolor=#fefefe
| 257442 ||  || — || September 9, 2010 || La Sagra || OAM Obs. || FLO || align=right data-sort-value="0.64" | 640 m || 
|-id=443 bgcolor=#fefefe
| 257443 || 2641 P-L || — || September 24, 1960 || Palomar || PLS || NYS || align=right data-sort-value="0.80" | 800 m || 
|-id=444 bgcolor=#E9E9E9
| 257444 ||  || — || September 24, 1960 || Palomar || PLS || EUN || align=right | 1.7 km || 
|-id=445 bgcolor=#fefefe
| 257445 ||  || — || September 24, 1960 || Palomar || PLS || — || align=right data-sort-value="0.93" | 930 m || 
|-id=446 bgcolor=#fefefe
| 257446 ||  || — || September 24, 1960 || Palomar || PLS || NYS || align=right data-sort-value="0.74" | 740 m || 
|-id=447 bgcolor=#fefefe
| 257447 ||  || — || September 29, 1973 || Palomar || PLS || NYS || align=right data-sort-value="0.78" | 780 m || 
|-id=448 bgcolor=#E9E9E9
| 257448 ||  || — || September 29, 1973 || Palomar || PLS || — || align=right | 1.2 km || 
|-id=449 bgcolor=#E9E9E9
| 257449 ||  || — || September 29, 1973 || Palomar || PLS || — || align=right | 1.2 km || 
|-id=450 bgcolor=#fefefe
| 257450 ||  || — || October 16, 1977 || Palomar || PLS || FLO || align=right data-sort-value="0.67" | 670 m || 
|-id=451 bgcolor=#fefefe
| 257451 ||  || — || October 16, 1977 || Palomar || PLS || FLO || align=right data-sort-value="0.98" | 980 m || 
|-id=452 bgcolor=#E9E9E9
| 257452 ||  || — || October 16, 1977 || Palomar || PLS || — || align=right | 3.4 km || 
|-id=453 bgcolor=#d6d6d6
| 257453 ||  || — || October 16, 1977 || Palomar || PLS || HYG || align=right | 3.6 km || 
|-id=454 bgcolor=#fefefe
| 257454 ||  || — || October 16, 1977 || Palomar || PLS || — || align=right data-sort-value="0.91" | 910 m || 
|-id=455 bgcolor=#d6d6d6
| 257455 ||  || — || October 16, 1977 || Palomar || PLS || — || align=right | 4.6 km || 
|-id=456 bgcolor=#d6d6d6
| 257456 ||  || — || February 28, 1981 || Siding Spring || S. J. Bus || HIL3:2 || align=right | 8.4 km || 
|-id=457 bgcolor=#fefefe
| 257457 ||  || — || March 1, 1981 || Siding Spring || S. J. Bus || — || align=right | 1.1 km || 
|-id=458 bgcolor=#d6d6d6
| 257458 ||  || — || March 7, 1981 || Siding Spring || S. J. Bus || — || align=right | 4.2 km || 
|-id=459 bgcolor=#fefefe
| 257459 ||  || — || March 7, 1981 || Siding Spring || S. J. Bus || — || align=right | 1.4 km || 
|-id=460 bgcolor=#fefefe
| 257460 ||  || — || March 1, 1981 || Siding Spring || S. J. Bus || — || align=right | 1.1 km || 
|-id=461 bgcolor=#fefefe
| 257461 ||  || — || October 18, 1990 || Kitt Peak || Spacewatch || — || align=right data-sort-value="0.90" | 900 m || 
|-id=462 bgcolor=#d6d6d6
| 257462 ||  || — || October 18, 1992 || Kitt Peak || Spacewatch || THM || align=right | 2.8 km || 
|-id=463 bgcolor=#E9E9E9
| 257463 ||  || — || November 19, 1992 || Kitt Peak || Spacewatch || — || align=right | 2.2 km || 
|-id=464 bgcolor=#fefefe
| 257464 ||  || — || March 21, 1993 || La Silla || UESAC || NYS || align=right | 1.0 km || 
|-id=465 bgcolor=#E9E9E9
| 257465 ||  || — || July 20, 1993 || La Silla || E. W. Elst || — || align=right | 2.0 km || 
|-id=466 bgcolor=#E9E9E9
| 257466 ||  || — || October 9, 1993 || Kitt Peak || Spacewatch || — || align=right | 2.0 km || 
|-id=467 bgcolor=#E9E9E9
| 257467 ||  || — || October 9, 1993 || La Silla || E. W. Elst || — || align=right | 1.2 km || 
|-id=468 bgcolor=#fefefe
| 257468 ||  || — || February 10, 1994 || Kitt Peak || Spacewatch || — || align=right | 1.2 km || 
|-id=469 bgcolor=#E9E9E9
| 257469 ||  || — || February 15, 1994 || Kitt Peak || Spacewatch || HOF || align=right | 3.7 km || 
|-id=470 bgcolor=#d6d6d6
| 257470 ||  || — || September 12, 1994 || Kitt Peak || Spacewatch || — || align=right | 3.9 km || 
|-id=471 bgcolor=#FA8072
| 257471 ||  || — || September 27, 1994 || Kitt Peak || Spacewatch || — || align=right data-sort-value="0.41" | 410 m || 
|-id=472 bgcolor=#fefefe
| 257472 ||  || — || September 28, 1994 || Kitt Peak || Spacewatch || NYS || align=right data-sort-value="0.81" | 810 m || 
|-id=473 bgcolor=#d6d6d6
| 257473 ||  || — || September 28, 1994 || Kitt Peak || Spacewatch || — || align=right | 2.6 km || 
|-id=474 bgcolor=#d6d6d6
| 257474 ||  || — || November 28, 1994 || Kitt Peak || Spacewatch || — || align=right | 4.7 km || 
|-id=475 bgcolor=#d6d6d6
| 257475 ||  || — || February 22, 1995 || Kitt Peak || Spacewatch || HYG || align=right | 3.6 km || 
|-id=476 bgcolor=#E9E9E9
| 257476 ||  || — || March 23, 1995 || Kitt Peak || Spacewatch || PAD || align=right | 1.8 km || 
|-id=477 bgcolor=#E9E9E9
| 257477 ||  || — || March 23, 1995 || Kitt Peak || Spacewatch || MIS || align=right | 3.0 km || 
|-id=478 bgcolor=#fefefe
| 257478 ||  || — || April 26, 1995 || Kitt Peak || Spacewatch || — || align=right data-sort-value="0.86" | 860 m || 
|-id=479 bgcolor=#E9E9E9
| 257479 ||  || — || June 24, 1995 || Kitt Peak || Spacewatch || — || align=right | 2.5 km || 
|-id=480 bgcolor=#d6d6d6
| 257480 ||  || — || July 1, 1995 || Kitt Peak || Spacewatch || EUP || align=right | 4.5 km || 
|-id=481 bgcolor=#fefefe
| 257481 ||  || — || July 22, 1995 || Kitt Peak || Spacewatch || NYS || align=right data-sort-value="0.94" | 940 m || 
|-id=482 bgcolor=#E9E9E9
| 257482 ||  || — || July 27, 1995 || Kitt Peak || Spacewatch || — || align=right | 2.4 km || 
|-id=483 bgcolor=#fefefe
| 257483 ||  || — || July 27, 1995 || Kitt Peak || Spacewatch || — || align=right data-sort-value="0.81" | 810 m || 
|-id=484 bgcolor=#fefefe
| 257484 ||  || — || August 25, 1995 || Kitt Peak || Spacewatch || V || align=right data-sort-value="0.70" | 700 m || 
|-id=485 bgcolor=#fefefe
| 257485 ||  || — || September 19, 1995 || Kitt Peak || Spacewatch || — || align=right | 2.9 km || 
|-id=486 bgcolor=#C2FFFF
| 257486 ||  || — || September 19, 1995 || Kitt Peak || Spacewatch || L4 || align=right | 8.7 km || 
|-id=487 bgcolor=#d6d6d6
| 257487 ||  || — || September 19, 1995 || Kitt Peak || Spacewatch || KOR || align=right | 1.5 km || 
|-id=488 bgcolor=#fefefe
| 257488 ||  || — || September 19, 1995 || Kitt Peak || Spacewatch || MAS || align=right data-sort-value="0.96" | 960 m || 
|-id=489 bgcolor=#d6d6d6
| 257489 ||  || — || October 17, 1995 || Kitt Peak || Spacewatch || KOR || align=right | 1.4 km || 
|-id=490 bgcolor=#fefefe
| 257490 ||  || — || October 18, 1995 || Kitt Peak || Spacewatch || — || align=right | 1.2 km || 
|-id=491 bgcolor=#fefefe
| 257491 ||  || — || October 22, 1995 || Kitt Peak || Spacewatch || MAS || align=right data-sort-value="0.80" | 800 m || 
|-id=492 bgcolor=#fefefe
| 257492 ||  || — || October 17, 1995 || Kitt Peak || Spacewatch || — || align=right data-sort-value="0.86" | 860 m || 
|-id=493 bgcolor=#fefefe
| 257493 ||  || — || October 18, 1995 || Kitt Peak || Spacewatch || NYS || align=right data-sort-value="0.88" | 880 m || 
|-id=494 bgcolor=#fefefe
| 257494 ||  || — || October 17, 1995 || Kitt Peak || Spacewatch || MAS || align=right data-sort-value="0.82" | 820 m || 
|-id=495 bgcolor=#C2FFFF
| 257495 ||  || — || October 18, 1995 || Kitt Peak || Spacewatch || L4 || align=right | 9.9 km || 
|-id=496 bgcolor=#fefefe
| 257496 ||  || — || November 15, 1995 || Kitt Peak || Spacewatch || MAS || align=right data-sort-value="0.79" | 790 m || 
|-id=497 bgcolor=#fefefe
| 257497 ||  || — || November 15, 1995 || Kitt Peak || Spacewatch || CLA || align=right | 2.3 km || 
|-id=498 bgcolor=#fefefe
| 257498 ||  || — || November 17, 1995 || Kitt Peak || Spacewatch || NYS || align=right data-sort-value="0.69" | 690 m || 
|-id=499 bgcolor=#fefefe
| 257499 ||  || — || November 18, 1995 || Kitt Peak || Spacewatch || MAS || align=right data-sort-value="0.81" | 810 m || 
|-id=500 bgcolor=#fefefe
| 257500 ||  || — || November 19, 1995 || Kitt Peak || Spacewatch || — || align=right | 1.1 km || 
|}

257501–257600 

|-bgcolor=#d6d6d6
| 257501 ||  || — || December 16, 1995 || Kitt Peak || Spacewatch || — || align=right | 3.4 km || 
|-id=502 bgcolor=#fefefe
| 257502 ||  || — || January 13, 1996 || Kitt Peak || Spacewatch || NYS || align=right data-sort-value="0.67" | 670 m || 
|-id=503 bgcolor=#d6d6d6
| 257503 ||  || — || January 24, 1996 || Kitt Peak || Spacewatch || — || align=right | 3.6 km || 
|-id=504 bgcolor=#fefefe
| 257504 ||  || — || April 11, 1996 || Kitt Peak || Spacewatch || — || align=right data-sort-value="0.80" | 800 m || 
|-id=505 bgcolor=#C2FFFF
| 257505 ||  || — || September 15, 1996 || La Silla || UDTS || L4 || align=right | 13 km || 
|-id=506 bgcolor=#E9E9E9
| 257506 ||  || — || September 23, 1996 || Prescott || P. G. Comba || — || align=right | 3.3 km || 
|-id=507 bgcolor=#fefefe
| 257507 ||  || — || October 11, 1996 || Kitt Peak || Spacewatch || — || align=right data-sort-value="0.98" | 980 m || 
|-id=508 bgcolor=#E9E9E9
| 257508 ||  || — || November 5, 1996 || Kitt Peak || Spacewatch || DOR || align=right | 2.7 km || 
|-id=509 bgcolor=#d6d6d6
| 257509 ||  || — || November 6, 1996 || Kitt Peak || Spacewatch || KAR || align=right | 1.1 km || 
|-id=510 bgcolor=#fefefe
| 257510 ||  || — || November 5, 1996 || Kitt Peak || Spacewatch || — || align=right data-sort-value="0.77" | 770 m || 
|-id=511 bgcolor=#fefefe
| 257511 ||  || — || December 12, 1996 || Kitt Peak || Spacewatch || V || align=right data-sort-value="0.73" | 730 m || 
|-id=512 bgcolor=#fefefe
| 257512 ||  || — || January 12, 1997 || Haleakala || NEAT || — || align=right | 1.3 km || 
|-id=513 bgcolor=#fefefe
| 257513 ||  || — || January 15, 1997 || Campo Imperatore || A. Boattini, A. Di Paola || MAS || align=right data-sort-value="0.78" | 780 m || 
|-id=514 bgcolor=#E9E9E9
| 257514 ||  || — || February 3, 1997 || Modra || A. Galád, A. Pravda || GEF || align=right | 1.9 km || 
|-id=515 bgcolor=#E9E9E9
| 257515 Zapperudi ||  ||  || February 6, 1997 || Linz || Davidschlag Obs. || — || align=right | 3.9 km || 
|-id=516 bgcolor=#d6d6d6
| 257516 ||  || — || February 13, 1997 || Kitt Peak || Spacewatch || — || align=right | 2.0 km || 
|-id=517 bgcolor=#fefefe
| 257517 ||  || — || March 10, 1997 || Socorro || LINEAR || — || align=right | 1.1 km || 
|-id=518 bgcolor=#fefefe
| 257518 ||  || — || April 8, 1997 || Kitt Peak || Spacewatch || — || align=right | 1.1 km || 
|-id=519 bgcolor=#E9E9E9
| 257519 ||  || — || May 29, 1997 || Kitt Peak || Spacewatch || MAR || align=right | 1.6 km || 
|-id=520 bgcolor=#fefefe
| 257520 || 1997 ML || — || June 26, 1997 || Kitt Peak || Spacewatch || — || align=right | 1.4 km || 
|-id=521 bgcolor=#E9E9E9
| 257521 ||  || — || June 26, 1997 || Kitt Peak || Spacewatch || — || align=right | 1.4 km || 
|-id=522 bgcolor=#E9E9E9
| 257522 ||  || — || September 11, 1997 || Modra || P. Kolény, L. Kornoš || — || align=right | 2.1 km || 
|-id=523 bgcolor=#E9E9E9
| 257523 ||  || — || September 30, 1997 || Prescott || P. G. Comba || — || align=right | 1.6 km || 
|-id=524 bgcolor=#fefefe
| 257524 ||  || — || September 28, 1997 || Kitt Peak || Spacewatch || — || align=right data-sort-value="0.89" | 890 m || 
|-id=525 bgcolor=#fefefe
| 257525 ||  || — || September 28, 1997 || Kitt Peak || Spacewatch || — || align=right data-sort-value="0.93" | 930 m || 
|-id=526 bgcolor=#E9E9E9
| 257526 ||  || — || September 30, 1997 || Kitt Peak || Spacewatch || — || align=right | 1.8 km || 
|-id=527 bgcolor=#E9E9E9
| 257527 ||  || — || October 11, 1997 || Kitt Peak || Spacewatch || — || align=right | 2.7 km || 
|-id=528 bgcolor=#fefefe
| 257528 ||  || — || October 25, 1997 || Anderson Mesa || B. A. Skiff || FLO || align=right data-sort-value="0.57" | 570 m || 
|-id=529 bgcolor=#fefefe
| 257529 ||  || — || November 22, 1997 || Kitt Peak || Spacewatch || — || align=right | 1.1 km || 
|-id=530 bgcolor=#E9E9E9
| 257530 ||  || — || December 31, 1997 || Kitt Peak || Spacewatch || NEM || align=right | 2.8 km || 
|-id=531 bgcolor=#E9E9E9
| 257531 ||  || — || January 23, 1998 || Kitt Peak || Spacewatch || HEN || align=right | 1.1 km || 
|-id=532 bgcolor=#d6d6d6
| 257532 ||  || — || January 23, 1998 || Kitt Peak || Spacewatch || — || align=right | 2.6 km || 
|-id=533 bgcolor=#fefefe
| 257533 Iquique ||  ||  || February 6, 1998 || La Silla || E. W. Elst || H || align=right data-sort-value="0.96" | 960 m || 
|-id=534 bgcolor=#fefefe
| 257534 ||  || — || February 23, 1998 || Kitt Peak || Spacewatch || NYS || align=right data-sort-value="0.92" | 920 m || 
|-id=535 bgcolor=#fefefe
| 257535 ||  || — || February 23, 1998 || Haleakala || NEAT || PHO || align=right | 1.5 km || 
|-id=536 bgcolor=#FA8072
| 257536 ||  || — || March 2, 1998 || Oizumi || T. Kobayashi || — || align=right data-sort-value="0.74" | 740 m || 
|-id=537 bgcolor=#E9E9E9
| 257537 ||  || — || March 20, 1998 || Socorro || LINEAR || INO || align=right | 2.0 km || 
|-id=538 bgcolor=#E9E9E9
| 257538 ||  || — || March 20, 1998 || Kitt Peak || Spacewatch || — || align=right | 2.6 km || 
|-id=539 bgcolor=#fefefe
| 257539 || 1998 HP || — || April 17, 1998 || Kitt Peak || Spacewatch || — || align=right data-sort-value="0.81" | 810 m || 
|-id=540 bgcolor=#E9E9E9
| 257540 ||  || — || April 21, 1998 || Kitt Peak || Spacewatch || HOF || align=right | 3.7 km || 
|-id=541 bgcolor=#d6d6d6
| 257541 ||  || — || April 21, 1998 || Socorro || LINEAR || — || align=right | 3.4 km || 
|-id=542 bgcolor=#fefefe
| 257542 ||  || — || June 20, 1998 || Kitt Peak || Spacewatch || — || align=right | 1.2 km || 
|-id=543 bgcolor=#d6d6d6
| 257543 ||  || — || June 27, 1998 || Kitt Peak || Spacewatch || — || align=right | 3.1 km || 
|-id=544 bgcolor=#d6d6d6
| 257544 ||  || — || August 22, 1998 || Xinglong || SCAP || TEL || align=right | 2.7 km || 
|-id=545 bgcolor=#E9E9E9
| 257545 ||  || — || September 14, 1998 || Kitt Peak || Spacewatch || critical || align=right data-sort-value="0.54" | 540 m || 
|-id=546 bgcolor=#E9E9E9
| 257546 ||  || — || September 15, 1998 || Kitt Peak || Spacewatch || — || align=right | 1.3 km || 
|-id=547 bgcolor=#fefefe
| 257547 ||  || — || September 20, 1998 || Kitt Peak || Spacewatch || NYS || align=right data-sort-value="0.74" | 740 m || 
|-id=548 bgcolor=#d6d6d6
| 257548 ||  || — || September 25, 1998 || Kitt Peak || Spacewatch || — || align=right | 4.8 km || 
|-id=549 bgcolor=#E9E9E9
| 257549 ||  || — || September 25, 1998 || Kitt Peak || Spacewatch || MIT || align=right | 3.2 km || 
|-id=550 bgcolor=#d6d6d6
| 257550 ||  || — || September 26, 1998 || Xinglong || SCAP || TIR || align=right | 4.1 km || 
|-id=551 bgcolor=#fefefe
| 257551 ||  || — || September 26, 1998 || Kitt Peak || Spacewatch || — || align=right data-sort-value="0.87" | 870 m || 
|-id=552 bgcolor=#E9E9E9
| 257552 ||  || — || September 26, 1998 || Kitt Peak || Spacewatch || — || align=right | 1.0 km || 
|-id=553 bgcolor=#d6d6d6
| 257553 ||  || — || September 19, 1998 || Socorro || LINEAR || — || align=right | 3.0 km || 
|-id=554 bgcolor=#fefefe
| 257554 ||  || — || September 26, 1998 || Socorro || LINEAR || V || align=right data-sort-value="0.97" | 970 m || 
|-id=555 bgcolor=#fefefe
| 257555 ||  || — || September 26, 1998 || Socorro || LINEAR || NYS || align=right data-sort-value="0.85" | 850 m || 
|-id=556 bgcolor=#d6d6d6
| 257556 ||  || — || September 19, 1998 || Apache Point || SDSS || THM || align=right | 3.0 km || 
|-id=557 bgcolor=#d6d6d6
| 257557 ||  || — || October 12, 1998 || Kitt Peak || Spacewatch || — || align=right | 3.6 km || 
|-id=558 bgcolor=#fefefe
| 257558 ||  || — || October 12, 1998 || Caussols || ODAS || NYS || align=right | 1.0 km || 
|-id=559 bgcolor=#d6d6d6
| 257559 ||  || — || October 15, 1998 || Xinglong || SCAP || — || align=right | 4.8 km || 
|-id=560 bgcolor=#fefefe
| 257560 ||  || — || October 14, 1998 || Kitt Peak || Spacewatch || NYS || align=right | 1.0 km || 
|-id=561 bgcolor=#C2FFFF
| 257561 ||  || — || October 14, 1998 || Kitt Peak || Spacewatch || L4 || align=right | 11 km || 
|-id=562 bgcolor=#E9E9E9
| 257562 ||  || — || October 15, 1998 || Kitt Peak || Spacewatch || — || align=right data-sort-value="0.90" | 900 m || 
|-id=563 bgcolor=#E9E9E9
| 257563 ||  || — || October 19, 1998 || Caussols || ODAS || — || align=right | 1.3 km || 
|-id=564 bgcolor=#fefefe
| 257564 ||  || — || October 28, 1998 || Socorro || LINEAR || NYS || align=right | 1.1 km || 
|-id=565 bgcolor=#fefefe
| 257565 ||  || — || October 18, 1998 || Anderson Mesa || LONEOS || — || align=right | 1.5 km || 
|-id=566 bgcolor=#C2FFFF
| 257566 ||  || — || November 21, 1998 || Kitt Peak || Spacewatch || L4ARK || align=right | 12 km || 
|-id=567 bgcolor=#fefefe
| 257567 ||  || — || December 8, 1998 || Kitt Peak || Spacewatch || V || align=right data-sort-value="0.87" | 870 m || 
|-id=568 bgcolor=#E9E9E9
| 257568 ||  || — || December 19, 1998 || Kitt Peak || Spacewatch || — || align=right | 1.5 km || 
|-id=569 bgcolor=#E9E9E9
| 257569 ||  || — || December 22, 1998 || Kitt Peak || Spacewatch || — || align=right | 1.2 km || 
|-id=570 bgcolor=#E9E9E9
| 257570 ||  || — || December 22, 1998 || Kitt Peak || Spacewatch || — || align=right | 1.6 km || 
|-id=571 bgcolor=#fefefe
| 257571 ||  || — || December 26, 1998 || Kitt Peak || Spacewatch || NYS || align=right | 1.0 km || 
|-id=572 bgcolor=#E9E9E9
| 257572 ||  || — || February 7, 1999 || Oizumi || T. Kobayashi || — || align=right | 1.9 km || 
|-id=573 bgcolor=#E9E9E9
| 257573 ||  || — || February 10, 1999 || Woomera || F. B. Zoltowski || — || align=right | 1.5 km || 
|-id=574 bgcolor=#fefefe
| 257574 ||  || — || February 12, 1999 || Socorro || LINEAR || — || align=right | 1.5 km || 
|-id=575 bgcolor=#E9E9E9
| 257575 ||  || — || February 12, 1999 || Socorro || LINEAR || — || align=right | 1.4 km || 
|-id=576 bgcolor=#E9E9E9
| 257576 ||  || — || February 10, 1999 || Socorro || LINEAR || EUN || align=right | 2.6 km || 
|-id=577 bgcolor=#E9E9E9
| 257577 ||  || — || February 10, 1999 || Socorro || LINEAR || — || align=right | 1.7 km || 
|-id=578 bgcolor=#E9E9E9
| 257578 ||  || — || February 12, 1999 || Socorro || LINEAR || — || align=right | 2.8 km || 
|-id=579 bgcolor=#E9E9E9
| 257579 ||  || — || February 8, 1999 || Kitt Peak || Spacewatch || MRX || align=right | 1.1 km || 
|-id=580 bgcolor=#E9E9E9
| 257580 ||  || — || February 18, 1999 || Socorro || LINEAR || — || align=right | 2.2 km || 
|-id=581 bgcolor=#FA8072
| 257581 ||  || — || March 20, 1999 || Socorro || LINEAR || — || align=right | 1.9 km || 
|-id=582 bgcolor=#fefefe
| 257582 ||  || — || March 20, 1999 || Apache Point || SDSS || — || align=right data-sort-value="0.79" | 790 m || 
|-id=583 bgcolor=#E9E9E9
| 257583 ||  || — || April 6, 1999 || Kitt Peak || Spacewatch || — || align=right | 1.7 km || 
|-id=584 bgcolor=#fefefe
| 257584 ||  || — || May 10, 1999 || Socorro || LINEAR || — || align=right | 1.2 km || 
|-id=585 bgcolor=#fefefe
| 257585 ||  || — || May 10, 1999 || Socorro || LINEAR || — || align=right data-sort-value="0.85" | 850 m || 
|-id=586 bgcolor=#fefefe
| 257586 ||  || — || May 10, 1999 || Socorro || LINEAR || — || align=right | 1.0 km || 
|-id=587 bgcolor=#E9E9E9
| 257587 ||  || — || May 10, 1999 || Socorro || LINEAR || — || align=right | 2.6 km || 
|-id=588 bgcolor=#E9E9E9
| 257588 ||  || — || May 12, 1999 || Socorro || LINEAR || — || align=right | 2.0 km || 
|-id=589 bgcolor=#E9E9E9
| 257589 ||  || — || May 13, 1999 || Socorro || LINEAR || — || align=right | 3.9 km || 
|-id=590 bgcolor=#d6d6d6
| 257590 ||  || — || May 18, 1999 || Socorro || LINEAR || YAK || align=right | 4.5 km || 
|-id=591 bgcolor=#d6d6d6
| 257591 ||  || — || September 3, 1999 || Kitt Peak || Spacewatch || — || align=right | 2.9 km || 
|-id=592 bgcolor=#d6d6d6
| 257592 ||  || — || September 4, 1999 || Kitt Peak || Spacewatch || — || align=right | 3.5 km || 
|-id=593 bgcolor=#fefefe
| 257593 ||  || — || September 7, 1999 || Socorro || LINEAR || — || align=right data-sort-value="0.88" | 880 m || 
|-id=594 bgcolor=#FA8072
| 257594 ||  || — || September 8, 1999 || Socorro || LINEAR || — || align=right | 1.8 km || 
|-id=595 bgcolor=#fefefe
| 257595 ||  || — || September 7, 1999 || Socorro || LINEAR || PHO || align=right | 1.6 km || 
|-id=596 bgcolor=#d6d6d6
| 257596 ||  || — || September 8, 1999 || Uccle || T. Pauwels || HYG || align=right | 3.1 km || 
|-id=597 bgcolor=#fefefe
| 257597 ||  || — || September 7, 1999 || Socorro || LINEAR || — || align=right data-sort-value="0.87" | 870 m || 
|-id=598 bgcolor=#fefefe
| 257598 ||  || — || September 7, 1999 || Socorro || LINEAR || — || align=right | 1.4 km || 
|-id=599 bgcolor=#fefefe
| 257599 ||  || — || September 7, 1999 || Socorro || LINEAR || — || align=right | 1.1 km || 
|-id=600 bgcolor=#fefefe
| 257600 ||  || — || September 7, 1999 || Socorro || LINEAR || — || align=right data-sort-value="0.83" | 830 m || 
|}

257601–257700 

|-bgcolor=#fefefe
| 257601 ||  || — || September 7, 1999 || Socorro || LINEAR || — || align=right data-sort-value="0.84" | 840 m || 
|-id=602 bgcolor=#d6d6d6
| 257602 ||  || — || September 8, 1999 || Socorro || LINEAR || — || align=right | 4.8 km || 
|-id=603 bgcolor=#fefefe
| 257603 ||  || — || September 8, 1999 || Socorro || LINEAR || V || align=right | 1.0 km || 
|-id=604 bgcolor=#fefefe
| 257604 ||  || — || September 9, 1999 || Socorro || LINEAR || V || align=right | 1.2 km || 
|-id=605 bgcolor=#fefefe
| 257605 ||  || — || September 8, 1999 || Socorro || LINEAR || FLO || align=right | 1.1 km || 
|-id=606 bgcolor=#d6d6d6
| 257606 ||  || — || September 8, 1999 || Socorro || LINEAR || — || align=right | 4.4 km || 
|-id=607 bgcolor=#d6d6d6
| 257607 ||  || — || September 8, 1999 || Socorro || LINEAR || — || align=right | 4.4 km || 
|-id=608 bgcolor=#d6d6d6
| 257608 ||  || — || September 13, 1999 || Bergisch Gladbac || W. Bickel || — || align=right | 2.8 km || 
|-id=609 bgcolor=#fefefe
| 257609 ||  || — || September 12, 1999 || Bergisch Gladbac || W. Bickel || MAS || align=right data-sort-value="0.79" | 790 m || 
|-id=610 bgcolor=#FA8072
| 257610 ||  || — || September 3, 1999 || Socorro || LINEAR || — || align=right | 1.8 km || 
|-id=611 bgcolor=#d6d6d6
| 257611 ||  || — || September 16, 1999 || Kitt Peak || Spacewatch || — || align=right | 3.0 km || 
|-id=612 bgcolor=#fefefe
| 257612 ||  || — || September 22, 1999 || Socorro || LINEAR || PHO || align=right | 1.7 km || 
|-id=613 bgcolor=#fefefe
| 257613 ||  || — || September 29, 1999 || Catalina || CSS || NYS || align=right data-sort-value="0.89" | 890 m || 
|-id=614 bgcolor=#d6d6d6
| 257614 ||  || — || October 1, 1999 || Kitt Peak || Spacewatch || — || align=right | 5.2 km || 
|-id=615 bgcolor=#fefefe
| 257615 ||  || — || October 9, 1999 || Kitt Peak || Spacewatch || V || align=right data-sort-value="0.94" | 940 m || 
|-id=616 bgcolor=#fefefe
| 257616 ||  || — || October 9, 1999 || Kitt Peak || Spacewatch || NYS || align=right data-sort-value="0.88" | 880 m || 
|-id=617 bgcolor=#fefefe
| 257617 ||  || — || October 10, 1999 || Kitt Peak || Spacewatch || NYS || align=right data-sort-value="0.54" | 540 m || 
|-id=618 bgcolor=#d6d6d6
| 257618 ||  || — || October 10, 1999 || Kitt Peak || Spacewatch || URS || align=right | 5.1 km || 
|-id=619 bgcolor=#d6d6d6
| 257619 ||  || — || October 10, 1999 || Kitt Peak || Spacewatch || — || align=right | 3.6 km || 
|-id=620 bgcolor=#fefefe
| 257620 ||  || — || October 10, 1999 || Kitt Peak || Spacewatch || — || align=right | 1.3 km || 
|-id=621 bgcolor=#fefefe
| 257621 ||  || — || October 4, 1999 || Socorro || LINEAR || — || align=right | 1.4 km || 
|-id=622 bgcolor=#fefefe
| 257622 ||  || — || October 4, 1999 || Socorro || LINEAR || NYS || align=right data-sort-value="0.84" | 840 m || 
|-id=623 bgcolor=#fefefe
| 257623 ||  || — || October 15, 1999 || Socorro || LINEAR || NYS || align=right data-sort-value="0.88" | 880 m || 
|-id=624 bgcolor=#fefefe
| 257624 ||  || — || October 6, 1999 || Socorro || LINEAR || — || align=right data-sort-value="0.91" | 910 m || 
|-id=625 bgcolor=#fefefe
| 257625 ||  || — || October 6, 1999 || Socorro || LINEAR || NYS || align=right data-sort-value="0.76" | 760 m || 
|-id=626 bgcolor=#fefefe
| 257626 ||  || — || October 6, 1999 || Socorro || LINEAR || — || align=right | 1.9 km || 
|-id=627 bgcolor=#fefefe
| 257627 ||  || — || October 10, 1999 || Socorro || LINEAR || FLO || align=right data-sort-value="0.98" | 980 m || 
|-id=628 bgcolor=#d6d6d6
| 257628 ||  || — || October 10, 1999 || Socorro || LINEAR || EOS || align=right | 2.7 km || 
|-id=629 bgcolor=#d6d6d6
| 257629 ||  || — || October 10, 1999 || Socorro || LINEAR || — || align=right | 3.2 km || 
|-id=630 bgcolor=#fefefe
| 257630 ||  || — || October 10, 1999 || Socorro || LINEAR || NYS || align=right | 1.1 km || 
|-id=631 bgcolor=#fefefe
| 257631 ||  || — || October 10, 1999 || Socorro || LINEAR || V || align=right data-sort-value="0.65" | 650 m || 
|-id=632 bgcolor=#fefefe
| 257632 ||  || — || October 10, 1999 || Socorro || LINEAR || — || align=right data-sort-value="0.94" | 940 m || 
|-id=633 bgcolor=#d6d6d6
| 257633 ||  || — || October 13, 1999 || Socorro || LINEAR || — || align=right | 3.4 km || 
|-id=634 bgcolor=#fefefe
| 257634 ||  || — || October 15, 1999 || Socorro || LINEAR || — || align=right | 1.3 km || 
|-id=635 bgcolor=#fefefe
| 257635 ||  || — || October 15, 1999 || Socorro || LINEAR || NYS || align=right data-sort-value="0.87" | 870 m || 
|-id=636 bgcolor=#fefefe
| 257636 ||  || — || October 3, 1999 || Kitt Peak || Spacewatch || — || align=right data-sort-value="0.91" | 910 m || 
|-id=637 bgcolor=#fefefe
| 257637 ||  || — || October 4, 1999 || Catalina || CSS || — || align=right | 1.1 km || 
|-id=638 bgcolor=#fefefe
| 257638 ||  || — || October 7, 1999 || Catalina || CSS || ERI || align=right | 1.6 km || 
|-id=639 bgcolor=#d6d6d6
| 257639 ||  || — || October 13, 1999 || Socorro || LINEAR || EOS || align=right | 3.2 km || 
|-id=640 bgcolor=#d6d6d6
| 257640 ||  || — || October 13, 1999 || Socorro || LINEAR || — || align=right | 3.0 km || 
|-id=641 bgcolor=#d6d6d6
| 257641 ||  || — || October 15, 1999 || Kitt Peak || Spacewatch || 637 || align=right | 3.2 km || 
|-id=642 bgcolor=#d6d6d6
| 257642 ||  || — || October 3, 1999 || Socorro || LINEAR || Tj (2.99) || align=right | 6.4 km || 
|-id=643 bgcolor=#d6d6d6
| 257643 ||  || — || October 9, 1999 || Socorro || LINEAR || — || align=right | 2.1 km || 
|-id=644 bgcolor=#fefefe
| 257644 ||  || — || October 10, 1999 || Socorro || LINEAR || — || align=right | 1.2 km || 
|-id=645 bgcolor=#fefefe
| 257645 ||  || — || October 12, 1999 || Socorro || LINEAR || — || align=right data-sort-value="0.98" | 980 m || 
|-id=646 bgcolor=#fefefe
| 257646 ||  || — || October 4, 1999 || Kitt Peak || Spacewatch || V || align=right data-sort-value="0.73" | 730 m || 
|-id=647 bgcolor=#fefefe
| 257647 ||  || — || October 12, 1999 || Kitt Peak || Spacewatch || V || align=right data-sort-value="0.60" | 600 m || 
|-id=648 bgcolor=#d6d6d6
| 257648 ||  || — || October 12, 1999 || Kitt Peak || Spacewatch || — || align=right | 2.3 km || 
|-id=649 bgcolor=#d6d6d6
| 257649 ||  || — || October 9, 1999 || Kitt Peak || Spacewatch || — || align=right | 2.9 km || 
|-id=650 bgcolor=#fefefe
| 257650 ||  || — || October 12, 1999 || Kitt Peak || Spacewatch || NYS || align=right data-sort-value="0.82" | 820 m || 
|-id=651 bgcolor=#d6d6d6
| 257651 ||  || — || October 29, 1999 || Kitt Peak || Spacewatch || — || align=right | 4.0 km || 
|-id=652 bgcolor=#d6d6d6
| 257652 ||  || — || October 31, 1999 || Kitt Peak || Spacewatch || ELF || align=right | 5.2 km || 
|-id=653 bgcolor=#fefefe
| 257653 ||  || — || October 31, 1999 || Kitt Peak || Spacewatch || MAS || align=right data-sort-value="0.69" | 690 m || 
|-id=654 bgcolor=#fefefe
| 257654 ||  || — || October 31, 1999 || Kitt Peak || Spacewatch || — || align=right data-sort-value="0.99" | 990 m || 
|-id=655 bgcolor=#d6d6d6
| 257655 ||  || — || October 16, 1999 || Kitt Peak || Spacewatch || EOS || align=right | 2.3 km || 
|-id=656 bgcolor=#fefefe
| 257656 ||  || — || October 30, 1999 || Catalina || CSS || ERI || align=right | 1.9 km || 
|-id=657 bgcolor=#fefefe
| 257657 || 1999 VE || — || November 1, 1999 || Olathe || Olathe || NYS || align=right data-sort-value="0.82" | 820 m || 
|-id=658 bgcolor=#fefefe
| 257658 ||  || — || November 3, 1999 || Socorro || LINEAR || — || align=right | 1.7 km || 
|-id=659 bgcolor=#d6d6d6
| 257659 ||  || — || November 3, 1999 || Socorro || LINEAR || TIR || align=right | 4.0 km || 
|-id=660 bgcolor=#fefefe
| 257660 ||  || — || November 11, 1999 || Kitt Peak || Spacewatch || — || align=right | 1.3 km || 
|-id=661 bgcolor=#fefefe
| 257661 ||  || — || November 1, 1999 || Kitt Peak || Spacewatch || NYS || align=right data-sort-value="0.72" | 720 m || 
|-id=662 bgcolor=#d6d6d6
| 257662 ||  || — || November 4, 1999 || Kitt Peak || Spacewatch || EOS || align=right | 3.0 km || 
|-id=663 bgcolor=#fefefe
| 257663 ||  || — || November 4, 1999 || Catalina || CSS || NYS || align=right data-sort-value="0.98" | 980 m || 
|-id=664 bgcolor=#fefefe
| 257664 ||  || — || November 3, 1999 || Socorro || LINEAR || H || align=right data-sort-value="0.73" | 730 m || 
|-id=665 bgcolor=#fefefe
| 257665 ||  || — || November 3, 1999 || Socorro || LINEAR || — || align=right | 1.5 km || 
|-id=666 bgcolor=#fefefe
| 257666 ||  || — || November 4, 1999 || Socorro || LINEAR || — || align=right | 1.8 km || 
|-id=667 bgcolor=#fefefe
| 257667 ||  || — || November 4, 1999 || Socorro || LINEAR || EUT || align=right data-sort-value="0.93" | 930 m || 
|-id=668 bgcolor=#fefefe
| 257668 ||  || — || November 4, 1999 || Socorro || LINEAR || — || align=right | 1.2 km || 
|-id=669 bgcolor=#fefefe
| 257669 ||  || — || November 5, 1999 || Kitt Peak || Spacewatch || — || align=right data-sort-value="0.97" | 970 m || 
|-id=670 bgcolor=#fefefe
| 257670 ||  || — || November 4, 1999 || Socorro || LINEAR || — || align=right | 1.1 km || 
|-id=671 bgcolor=#fefefe
| 257671 ||  || — || November 9, 1999 || Socorro || LINEAR || — || align=right | 1.0 km || 
|-id=672 bgcolor=#fefefe
| 257672 ||  || — || November 9, 1999 || Socorro || LINEAR || NYS || align=right data-sort-value="0.97" | 970 m || 
|-id=673 bgcolor=#fefefe
| 257673 ||  || — || November 9, 1999 || Socorro || LINEAR || — || align=right data-sort-value="0.80" | 800 m || 
|-id=674 bgcolor=#d6d6d6
| 257674 ||  || — || November 4, 1999 || Kitt Peak || Spacewatch || EOS || align=right | 2.3 km || 
|-id=675 bgcolor=#d6d6d6
| 257675 ||  || — || November 4, 1999 || Kitt Peak || Spacewatch || — || align=right | 2.7 km || 
|-id=676 bgcolor=#d6d6d6
| 257676 ||  || — || November 6, 1999 || Kitt Peak || Spacewatch || THM || align=right | 2.7 km || 
|-id=677 bgcolor=#fefefe
| 257677 ||  || — || November 9, 1999 || Kitt Peak || Spacewatch || NYS || align=right data-sort-value="0.91" | 910 m || 
|-id=678 bgcolor=#d6d6d6
| 257678 ||  || — || November 11, 1999 || Kitt Peak || Spacewatch || — || align=right | 3.6 km || 
|-id=679 bgcolor=#d6d6d6
| 257679 ||  || — || November 9, 1999 || Kitt Peak || Spacewatch || — || align=right | 3.1 km || 
|-id=680 bgcolor=#fefefe
| 257680 ||  || — || November 10, 1999 || Kitt Peak || Spacewatch || MAS || align=right data-sort-value="0.84" | 840 m || 
|-id=681 bgcolor=#d6d6d6
| 257681 ||  || — || November 9, 1999 || Socorro || LINEAR || THM || align=right | 2.6 km || 
|-id=682 bgcolor=#d6d6d6
| 257682 ||  || — || November 14, 1999 || Socorro || LINEAR || URS || align=right | 4.0 km || 
|-id=683 bgcolor=#d6d6d6
| 257683 ||  || — || November 14, 1999 || Socorro || LINEAR || — || align=right | 4.2 km || 
|-id=684 bgcolor=#fefefe
| 257684 ||  || — || November 14, 1999 || Socorro || LINEAR || NYS || align=right | 1.2 km || 
|-id=685 bgcolor=#d6d6d6
| 257685 ||  || — || November 14, 1999 || Socorro || LINEAR || ALA || align=right | 5.0 km || 
|-id=686 bgcolor=#fefefe
| 257686 ||  || — || November 14, 1999 || Socorro || LINEAR || ERI || align=right | 1.4 km || 
|-id=687 bgcolor=#fefefe
| 257687 ||  || — || November 9, 1999 || Socorro || LINEAR || MAS || align=right data-sort-value="0.66" | 660 m || 
|-id=688 bgcolor=#d6d6d6
| 257688 ||  || — || November 15, 1999 || Socorro || LINEAR || — || align=right | 4.1 km || 
|-id=689 bgcolor=#d6d6d6
| 257689 ||  || — || November 3, 1999 || Catalina || CSS || — || align=right | 4.7 km || 
|-id=690 bgcolor=#fefefe
| 257690 ||  || — || November 12, 1999 || Socorro || LINEAR || MAS || align=right data-sort-value="0.79" | 790 m || 
|-id=691 bgcolor=#fefefe
| 257691 ||  || — || November 12, 1999 || Socorro || LINEAR || V || align=right data-sort-value="0.78" | 780 m || 
|-id=692 bgcolor=#fefefe
| 257692 ||  || — || November 28, 1999 || Gnosca || S. Sposetti || PHO || align=right | 2.0 km || 
|-id=693 bgcolor=#fefefe
| 257693 ||  || — || November 29, 1999 || Kitt Peak || Spacewatch || — || align=right data-sort-value="0.89" | 890 m || 
|-id=694 bgcolor=#fefefe
| 257694 ||  || — || November 28, 1999 || Kitt Peak || Spacewatch || MAS || align=right data-sort-value="0.69" | 690 m || 
|-id=695 bgcolor=#d6d6d6
| 257695 ||  || — || November 28, 1999 || Kitt Peak || Spacewatch || THM || align=right | 2.2 km || 
|-id=696 bgcolor=#d6d6d6
| 257696 ||  || — || November 16, 1999 || Kitt Peak || Spacewatch || — || align=right | 4.5 km || 
|-id=697 bgcolor=#d6d6d6
| 257697 ||  || — || November 16, 1999 || Kitt Peak || Spacewatch || THM || align=right | 2.6 km || 
|-id=698 bgcolor=#d6d6d6
| 257698 ||  || — || November 17, 1999 || Kitt Peak || Spacewatch || — || align=right | 2.2 km || 
|-id=699 bgcolor=#d6d6d6
| 257699 ||  || — || November 17, 1999 || Kitt Peak || Spacewatch || HYG || align=right | 3.1 km || 
|-id=700 bgcolor=#d6d6d6
| 257700 ||  || — || November 29, 1999 || Kitt Peak || Spacewatch || VER || align=right | 4.0 km || 
|}

257701–257800 

|-bgcolor=#fefefe
| 257701 ||  || — || December 4, 1999 || Catalina || CSS || — || align=right | 1.2 km || 
|-id=702 bgcolor=#fefefe
| 257702 ||  || — || December 5, 1999 || Socorro || LINEAR || — || align=right | 1.2 km || 
|-id=703 bgcolor=#fefefe
| 257703 ||  || — || December 7, 1999 || Socorro || LINEAR || NYS || align=right data-sort-value="0.97" | 970 m || 
|-id=704 bgcolor=#fefefe
| 257704 ||  || — || December 7, 1999 || Socorro || LINEAR || NYS || align=right data-sort-value="0.79" | 790 m || 
|-id=705 bgcolor=#fefefe
| 257705 ||  || — || December 7, 1999 || Socorro || LINEAR || NYS || align=right data-sort-value="0.79" | 790 m || 
|-id=706 bgcolor=#d6d6d6
| 257706 ||  || — || December 7, 1999 || Socorro || LINEAR || ALA || align=right | 4.6 km || 
|-id=707 bgcolor=#fefefe
| 257707 ||  || — || December 7, 1999 || Socorro || LINEAR || — || align=right | 1.0 km || 
|-id=708 bgcolor=#fefefe
| 257708 ||  || — || December 7, 1999 || Socorro || LINEAR || — || align=right | 1.7 km || 
|-id=709 bgcolor=#fefefe
| 257709 ||  || — || December 7, 1999 || Socorro || LINEAR || — || align=right | 1.4 km || 
|-id=710 bgcolor=#fefefe
| 257710 ||  || — || December 12, 1999 || Prescott || P. G. Comba || NYS || align=right data-sort-value="0.90" | 900 m || 
|-id=711 bgcolor=#fefefe
| 257711 ||  || — || December 5, 1999 || Catalina || CSS || — || align=right | 1.6 km || 
|-id=712 bgcolor=#fefefe
| 257712 ||  || — || December 7, 1999 || Catalina || CSS || — || align=right | 1.2 km || 
|-id=713 bgcolor=#d6d6d6
| 257713 ||  || — || December 4, 1999 || Kitt Peak || Spacewatch || — || align=right | 4.5 km || 
|-id=714 bgcolor=#d6d6d6
| 257714 ||  || — || December 2, 1999 || Kitt Peak || Spacewatch || — || align=right | 3.6 km || 
|-id=715 bgcolor=#fefefe
| 257715 ||  || — || December 10, 1999 || Socorro || LINEAR || H || align=right | 1.1 km || 
|-id=716 bgcolor=#fefefe
| 257716 ||  || — || December 12, 1999 || Socorro || LINEAR || — || align=right | 1.8 km || 
|-id=717 bgcolor=#fefefe
| 257717 ||  || — || December 8, 1999 || Kitt Peak || Spacewatch || NYS || align=right data-sort-value="0.82" | 820 m || 
|-id=718 bgcolor=#d6d6d6
| 257718 ||  || — || December 8, 1999 || Kitt Peak || Spacewatch || — || align=right | 3.7 km || 
|-id=719 bgcolor=#d6d6d6
| 257719 ||  || — || December 8, 1999 || Socorro || LINEAR || TIR || align=right | 4.8 km || 
|-id=720 bgcolor=#d6d6d6
| 257720 ||  || — || December 13, 1999 || Kitt Peak || Spacewatch || THM || align=right | 2.0 km || 
|-id=721 bgcolor=#fefefe
| 257721 ||  || — || December 13, 1999 || Kitt Peak || Spacewatch || — || align=right | 1.2 km || 
|-id=722 bgcolor=#fefefe
| 257722 ||  || — || December 15, 1999 || Kitt Peak || Spacewatch || NYS || align=right data-sort-value="0.83" | 830 m || 
|-id=723 bgcolor=#fefefe
| 257723 ||  || — || December 13, 1999 || Kitt Peak || Spacewatch || — || align=right | 1.0 km || 
|-id=724 bgcolor=#d6d6d6
| 257724 ||  || — || December 14, 1999 || Kitt Peak || Spacewatch || — || align=right | 3.7 km || 
|-id=725 bgcolor=#fefefe
| 257725 ||  || — || December 2, 1999 || Anderson Mesa || LONEOS || — || align=right | 1.9 km || 
|-id=726 bgcolor=#d6d6d6
| 257726 ||  || — || December 6, 1999 || Socorro || LINEAR || — || align=right | 4.9 km || 
|-id=727 bgcolor=#E9E9E9
| 257727 ||  || — || December 12, 1999 || Kitt Peak || Spacewatch || — || align=right | 1.6 km || 
|-id=728 bgcolor=#fefefe
| 257728 ||  || — || December 8, 1999 || Kitt Peak || Spacewatch || — || align=right data-sort-value="0.89" | 890 m || 
|-id=729 bgcolor=#fefefe
| 257729 ||  || — || December 7, 1999 || Socorro || LINEAR || NYS || align=right data-sort-value="0.67" | 670 m || 
|-id=730 bgcolor=#d6d6d6
| 257730 ||  || — || December 5, 1999 || Kitt Peak || Spacewatch || — || align=right | 4.0 km || 
|-id=731 bgcolor=#fefefe
| 257731 ||  || — || December 27, 1999 || Oizumi || T. Kobayashi || — || align=right | 1.6 km || 
|-id=732 bgcolor=#fefefe
| 257732 ||  || — || December 30, 1999 || Socorro || LINEAR || PHO || align=right | 1.5 km || 
|-id=733 bgcolor=#d6d6d6
| 257733 ||  || — || December 27, 1999 || Kitt Peak || Spacewatch || — || align=right | 5.1 km || 
|-id=734 bgcolor=#fefefe
| 257734 ||  || — || December 30, 1999 || Mauna Kea || C. Veillet || — || align=right | 1.0 km || 
|-id=735 bgcolor=#fefefe
| 257735 ||  || — || December 30, 1999 || Socorro || LINEAR || — || align=right | 1.4 km || 
|-id=736 bgcolor=#d6d6d6
| 257736 ||  || — || January 5, 2000 || Socorro || LINEAR || EUP || align=right | 6.2 km || 
|-id=737 bgcolor=#FA8072
| 257737 ||  || — || January 5, 2000 || Socorro || LINEAR || — || align=right | 1.4 km || 
|-id=738 bgcolor=#fefefe
| 257738 ||  || — || January 5, 2000 || Socorro || LINEAR || H || align=right | 1.0 km || 
|-id=739 bgcolor=#d6d6d6
| 257739 ||  || — || January 4, 2000 || Socorro || LINEAR || LIX || align=right | 6.1 km || 
|-id=740 bgcolor=#fefefe
| 257740 ||  || — || January 3, 2000 || Socorro || LINEAR || — || align=right | 1.2 km || 
|-id=741 bgcolor=#d6d6d6
| 257741 ||  || — || January 7, 2000 || Socorro || LINEAR || — || align=right | 4.0 km || 
|-id=742 bgcolor=#d6d6d6
| 257742 ||  || — || January 10, 2000 || Prescott || P. G. Comba || — || align=right | 3.9 km || 
|-id=743 bgcolor=#d6d6d6
| 257743 ||  || — || January 7, 2000 || Socorro || LINEAR || — || align=right | 5.9 km || 
|-id=744 bgcolor=#FFC2E0
| 257744 ||  || — || January 8, 2000 || Anderson Mesa || LONEOS || APO || align=right data-sort-value="0.66" | 660 m || 
|-id=745 bgcolor=#E9E9E9
| 257745 ||  || — || January 4, 2000 || Kitt Peak || Spacewatch || — || align=right | 1.2 km || 
|-id=746 bgcolor=#fefefe
| 257746 ||  || — || January 5, 2000 || Kitt Peak || Spacewatch || — || align=right | 1.3 km || 
|-id=747 bgcolor=#d6d6d6
| 257747 ||  || — || January 8, 2000 || Kitt Peak || Spacewatch || — || align=right | 3.4 km || 
|-id=748 bgcolor=#d6d6d6
| 257748 ||  || — || January 8, 2000 || Kitt Peak || Spacewatch || — || align=right | 3.0 km || 
|-id=749 bgcolor=#fefefe
| 257749 ||  || — || January 10, 2000 || Kitt Peak || Spacewatch || — || align=right | 1.0 km || 
|-id=750 bgcolor=#fefefe
| 257750 || 2000 BN || — || January 24, 2000 || Višnjan Observatory || K. Korlević || NYS || align=right | 1.1 km || 
|-id=751 bgcolor=#fefefe
| 257751 ||  || — || January 27, 2000 || Kitt Peak || Spacewatch || — || align=right | 1.2 km || 
|-id=752 bgcolor=#E9E9E9
| 257752 ||  || — || January 28, 2000 || Kitt Peak || Spacewatch || — || align=right | 3.0 km || 
|-id=753 bgcolor=#fefefe
| 257753 ||  || — || January 28, 2000 || Uenohara || N. Kawasato || — || align=right | 1.4 km || 
|-id=754 bgcolor=#fefefe
| 257754 ||  || — || January 30, 2000 || Socorro || LINEAR || — || align=right | 1.3 km || 
|-id=755 bgcolor=#d6d6d6
| 257755 ||  || — || January 26, 2000 || Kitt Peak || Spacewatch || THM || align=right | 2.7 km || 
|-id=756 bgcolor=#d6d6d6
| 257756 ||  || — || January 29, 2000 || Kitt Peak || Spacewatch || — || align=right | 6.1 km || 
|-id=757 bgcolor=#fefefe
| 257757 ||  || — || January 31, 2000 || Socorro || LINEAR || — || align=right | 1.4 km || 
|-id=758 bgcolor=#d6d6d6
| 257758 ||  || — || January 31, 2000 || Socorro || LINEAR || — || align=right | 5.0 km || 
|-id=759 bgcolor=#d6d6d6
| 257759 ||  || — || January 27, 2000 || Kitt Peak || Spacewatch || EOS || align=right | 3.1 km || 
|-id=760 bgcolor=#fefefe
| 257760 ||  || — || January 30, 2000 || Kitt Peak || Spacewatch || — || align=right | 1.4 km || 
|-id=761 bgcolor=#d6d6d6
| 257761 ||  || — || January 26, 2000 || Kitt Peak || Spacewatch || — || align=right | 4.2 km || 
|-id=762 bgcolor=#d6d6d6
| 257762 ||  || — || January 27, 2000 || Kitt Peak || Spacewatch || — || align=right | 3.2 km || 
|-id=763 bgcolor=#fefefe
| 257763 ||  || — || January 16, 2000 || Kitt Peak || Spacewatch || — || align=right | 1.1 km || 
|-id=764 bgcolor=#d6d6d6
| 257764 ||  || — || January 27, 2000 || Kitt Peak || Spacewatch || — || align=right | 3.7 km || 
|-id=765 bgcolor=#d6d6d6
| 257765 ||  || — || February 4, 2000 || Višnjan || K. Korlević || — || align=right | 4.7 km || 
|-id=766 bgcolor=#d6d6d6
| 257766 ||  || — || February 2, 2000 || Socorro || LINEAR || — || align=right | 5.7 km || 
|-id=767 bgcolor=#d6d6d6
| 257767 ||  || — || February 1, 2000 || Kitt Peak || Spacewatch || — || align=right | 3.0 km || 
|-id=768 bgcolor=#fefefe
| 257768 ||  || — || February 7, 2000 || Kitt Peak || Spacewatch || MAS || align=right | 1.1 km || 
|-id=769 bgcolor=#E9E9E9
| 257769 ||  || — || February 4, 2000 || Socorro || LINEAR || — || align=right | 1.7 km || 
|-id=770 bgcolor=#d6d6d6
| 257770 ||  || — || February 7, 2000 || Kitt Peak || Spacewatch || — || align=right | 3.6 km || 
|-id=771 bgcolor=#fefefe
| 257771 ||  || — || February 8, 2000 || Kitt Peak || Spacewatch || — || align=right data-sort-value="0.87" | 870 m || 
|-id=772 bgcolor=#fefefe
| 257772 ||  || — || February 5, 2000 || Kitt Peak || M. W. Buie || NYS || align=right data-sort-value="0.77" | 770 m || 
|-id=773 bgcolor=#fefefe
| 257773 ||  || — || February 6, 2000 || Kitt Peak || M. W. Buie || — || align=right data-sort-value="0.70" | 700 m || 
|-id=774 bgcolor=#fefefe
| 257774 ||  || — || February 7, 2000 || Kitt Peak || Spacewatch || — || align=right | 1.1 km || 
|-id=775 bgcolor=#C2FFFF
| 257775 ||  || — || February 3, 2000 || Kitt Peak || Spacewatch || L4 || align=right | 7.7 km || 
|-id=776 bgcolor=#d6d6d6
| 257776 ||  || — || February 1, 2000 || Kitt Peak || Spacewatch || — || align=right | 3.2 km || 
|-id=777 bgcolor=#fefefe
| 257777 ||  || — || February 4, 2000 || Kitt Peak || Spacewatch || — || align=right | 1.0 km || 
|-id=778 bgcolor=#fefefe
| 257778 ||  || — || February 26, 2000 || Kitt Peak || Spacewatch || MAS || align=right data-sort-value="0.96" | 960 m || 
|-id=779 bgcolor=#fefefe
| 257779 ||  || — || February 27, 2000 || Kitt Peak || Spacewatch || MAS || align=right | 1.0 km || 
|-id=780 bgcolor=#E9E9E9
| 257780 ||  || — || February 29, 2000 || Socorro || LINEAR || GER || align=right | 2.5 km || 
|-id=781 bgcolor=#fefefe
| 257781 ||  || — || February 29, 2000 || Socorro || LINEAR || — || align=right | 1.0 km || 
|-id=782 bgcolor=#fefefe
| 257782 ||  || — || February 29, 2000 || Socorro || LINEAR || MAS || align=right | 1.00 km || 
|-id=783 bgcolor=#E9E9E9
| 257783 ||  || — || February 29, 2000 || Socorro || LINEAR || — || align=right | 1.3 km || 
|-id=784 bgcolor=#fefefe
| 257784 ||  || — || February 29, 2000 || Socorro || LINEAR || V || align=right | 1.2 km || 
|-id=785 bgcolor=#E9E9E9
| 257785 ||  || — || February 29, 2000 || Socorro || LINEAR || MAR || align=right | 1.3 km || 
|-id=786 bgcolor=#d6d6d6
| 257786 ||  || — || February 29, 2000 || Socorro || LINEAR || — || align=right | 5.2 km || 
|-id=787 bgcolor=#fefefe
| 257787 ||  || — || February 29, 2000 || Socorro || LINEAR || — || align=right | 1.1 km || 
|-id=788 bgcolor=#fefefe
| 257788 ||  || — || February 29, 2000 || Socorro || LINEAR || — || align=right | 2.1 km || 
|-id=789 bgcolor=#fefefe
| 257789 ||  || — || February 29, 2000 || Socorro || LINEAR || — || align=right | 1.6 km || 
|-id=790 bgcolor=#fefefe
| 257790 ||  || — || February 27, 2000 || Kitt Peak || Spacewatch || NYS || align=right data-sort-value="0.90" | 900 m || 
|-id=791 bgcolor=#fefefe
| 257791 ||  || — || February 29, 2000 || Socorro || LINEAR || ERI || align=right | 2.4 km || 
|-id=792 bgcolor=#fefefe
| 257792 ||  || — || March 3, 2000 || Socorro || LINEAR || MAS || align=right | 1.1 km || 
|-id=793 bgcolor=#fefefe
| 257793 ||  || — || March 3, 2000 || Socorro || LINEAR || — || align=right data-sort-value="0.96" | 960 m || 
|-id=794 bgcolor=#fefefe
| 257794 ||  || — || March 3, 2000 || Kitt Peak || Spacewatch || NYS || align=right data-sort-value="0.77" | 770 m || 
|-id=795 bgcolor=#E9E9E9
| 257795 ||  || — || March 4, 2000 || Socorro || LINEAR || — || align=right | 1.5 km || 
|-id=796 bgcolor=#E9E9E9
| 257796 ||  || — || March 4, 2000 || Socorro || LINEAR || BRU || align=right | 3.5 km || 
|-id=797 bgcolor=#E9E9E9
| 257797 ||  || — || March 3, 2000 || Kitt Peak || Spacewatch || — || align=right | 1.0 km || 
|-id=798 bgcolor=#fefefe
| 257798 ||  || — || March 8, 2000 || Kitt Peak || Spacewatch || NYS || align=right data-sort-value="0.88" | 880 m || 
|-id=799 bgcolor=#fefefe
| 257799 ||  || — || March 8, 2000 || Kitt Peak || Spacewatch || — || align=right | 1.0 km || 
|-id=800 bgcolor=#fefefe
| 257800 ||  || — || March 8, 2000 || Socorro || LINEAR || MAS || align=right | 1.1 km || 
|}

257801–257900 

|-bgcolor=#fefefe
| 257801 ||  || — || March 10, 2000 || Socorro || LINEAR || — || align=right | 1.1 km || 
|-id=802 bgcolor=#fefefe
| 257802 ||  || — || March 9, 2000 || Kitt Peak || Spacewatch || MAS || align=right data-sort-value="0.96" | 960 m || 
|-id=803 bgcolor=#FA8072
| 257803 ||  || — || March 5, 2000 || Socorro || LINEAR || — || align=right | 2.1 km || 
|-id=804 bgcolor=#fefefe
| 257804 ||  || — || March 5, 2000 || Socorro || LINEAR || — || align=right | 1.3 km || 
|-id=805 bgcolor=#d6d6d6
| 257805 ||  || — || March 8, 2000 || Haleakala || NEAT || EUP || align=right | 6.0 km || 
|-id=806 bgcolor=#fefefe
| 257806 ||  || — || March 11, 2000 || Socorro || LINEAR || NYS || align=right data-sort-value="0.90" | 900 m || 
|-id=807 bgcolor=#fefefe
| 257807 ||  || — || March 11, 2000 || Socorro || LINEAR || — || align=right | 1.3 km || 
|-id=808 bgcolor=#E9E9E9
| 257808 ||  || — || March 3, 2000 || Socorro || LINEAR || — || align=right | 1.2 km || 
|-id=809 bgcolor=#E9E9E9
| 257809 ||  || — || March 27, 2000 || Kitt Peak || Spacewatch || — || align=right | 1.2 km || 
|-id=810 bgcolor=#E9E9E9
| 257810 ||  || — || March 29, 2000 || Socorro || LINEAR || — || align=right | 2.1 km || 
|-id=811 bgcolor=#E9E9E9
| 257811 ||  || — || March 29, 2000 || Socorro || LINEAR || — || align=right | 2.9 km || 
|-id=812 bgcolor=#E9E9E9
| 257812 ||  || — || March 29, 2000 || Socorro || LINEAR || — || align=right | 1.8 km || 
|-id=813 bgcolor=#E9E9E9
| 257813 ||  || — || March 27, 2000 || Anderson Mesa || LONEOS || — || align=right | 2.5 km || 
|-id=814 bgcolor=#fefefe
| 257814 ||  || — || March 29, 2000 || Socorro || LINEAR || — || align=right | 1.2 km || 
|-id=815 bgcolor=#E9E9E9
| 257815 ||  || — || April 5, 2000 || Socorro || LINEAR || MIS || align=right | 2.7 km || 
|-id=816 bgcolor=#fefefe
| 257816 ||  || — || April 5, 2000 || Socorro || LINEAR || NYS || align=right data-sort-value="0.82" | 820 m || 
|-id=817 bgcolor=#fefefe
| 257817 ||  || — || April 5, 2000 || Socorro || LINEAR || — || align=right | 1.3 km || 
|-id=818 bgcolor=#E9E9E9
| 257818 ||  || — || April 5, 2000 || Socorro || LINEAR || — || align=right | 1.3 km || 
|-id=819 bgcolor=#E9E9E9
| 257819 ||  || — || April 5, 2000 || Socorro || LINEAR || — || align=right | 1.0 km || 
|-id=820 bgcolor=#d6d6d6
| 257820 ||  || — || April 3, 2000 || Socorro || LINEAR || EUP || align=right | 6.3 km || 
|-id=821 bgcolor=#E9E9E9
| 257821 ||  || — || April 6, 2000 || Kitt Peak || Spacewatch || ADE || align=right | 2.5 km || 
|-id=822 bgcolor=#E9E9E9
| 257822 ||  || — || April 10, 2000 || Kitt Peak || Spacewatch || — || align=right | 3.1 km || 
|-id=823 bgcolor=#fefefe
| 257823 ||  || — || April 7, 2000 || Anderson Mesa || LONEOS || — || align=right | 1.5 km || 
|-id=824 bgcolor=#E9E9E9
| 257824 ||  || — || April 6, 2000 || Kitt Peak || Spacewatch || — || align=right | 1.8 km || 
|-id=825 bgcolor=#E9E9E9
| 257825 ||  || — || April 5, 2000 || Socorro || LINEAR || HEN || align=right | 1.5 km || 
|-id=826 bgcolor=#fefefe
| 257826 ||  || — || April 6, 2000 || Anderson Mesa || LONEOS || NYS || align=right data-sort-value="0.89" | 890 m || 
|-id=827 bgcolor=#E9E9E9
| 257827 ||  || — || April 4, 2000 || Socorro || LINEAR || — || align=right | 3.3 km || 
|-id=828 bgcolor=#E9E9E9
| 257828 ||  || — || April 4, 2000 || Socorro || LINEAR || RAF || align=right | 1.3 km || 
|-id=829 bgcolor=#E9E9E9
| 257829 ||  || — || April 3, 2000 || Kitt Peak || Spacewatch || — || align=right | 1.3 km || 
|-id=830 bgcolor=#E9E9E9
| 257830 ||  || — || April 28, 2000 || Socorro || LINEAR || JUN || align=right | 1.6 km || 
|-id=831 bgcolor=#E9E9E9
| 257831 ||  || — || April 30, 2000 || Socorro || LINEAR || — || align=right | 1.5 km || 
|-id=832 bgcolor=#E9E9E9
| 257832 ||  || — || April 29, 2000 || Socorro || LINEAR || — || align=right | 2.8 km || 
|-id=833 bgcolor=#E9E9E9
| 257833 ||  || — || April 24, 2000 || Anderson Mesa || LONEOS || — || align=right | 1.3 km || 
|-id=834 bgcolor=#E9E9E9
| 257834 ||  || — || May 3, 2000 || Socorro || LINEAR || — || align=right | 1.6 km || 
|-id=835 bgcolor=#E9E9E9
| 257835 ||  || — || May 3, 2000 || Socorro || LINEAR || JUN || align=right | 1.7 km || 
|-id=836 bgcolor=#E9E9E9
| 257836 ||  || — || May 7, 2000 || Socorro || LINEAR || — || align=right | 2.1 km || 
|-id=837 bgcolor=#E9E9E9
| 257837 ||  || — || May 7, 2000 || Socorro || LINEAR || — || align=right | 2.0 km || 
|-id=838 bgcolor=#FFC2E0
| 257838 ||  || — || May 11, 2000 || Socorro || LINEAR || AMO +1km || align=right data-sort-value="0.93" | 930 m || 
|-id=839 bgcolor=#d6d6d6
| 257839 ||  || — || May 4, 2000 || Apache Point || SDSS || 7:4 || align=right | 4.6 km || 
|-id=840 bgcolor=#E9E9E9
| 257840 ||  || — || May 27, 2000 || Socorro || LINEAR || — || align=right | 3.1 km || 
|-id=841 bgcolor=#E9E9E9
| 257841 ||  || — || May 28, 2000 || Socorro || LINEAR || — || align=right | 1.6 km || 
|-id=842 bgcolor=#E9E9E9
| 257842 ||  || — || May 24, 2000 || Kitt Peak || Spacewatch || — || align=right | 2.0 km || 
|-id=843 bgcolor=#E9E9E9
| 257843 ||  || — || May 28, 2000 || Kitt Peak || Spacewatch || — || align=right | 3.0 km || 
|-id=844 bgcolor=#E9E9E9
| 257844 ||  || — || May 31, 2000 || Ondřejov || P. Kušnirák, P. Pravec || — || align=right | 2.9 km || 
|-id=845 bgcolor=#E9E9E9
| 257845 ||  || — || May 25, 2000 || Kitt Peak || Spacewatch || RAF || align=right | 1.2 km || 
|-id=846 bgcolor=#E9E9E9
| 257846 ||  || — || June 6, 2000 || Kitt Peak || Spacewatch || — || align=right | 2.2 km || 
|-id=847 bgcolor=#E9E9E9
| 257847 ||  || — || June 3, 2000 || Kitt Peak || Spacewatch || WIT || align=right | 1.2 km || 
|-id=848 bgcolor=#E9E9E9
| 257848 || 2000 MJ || — || June 24, 2000 || Tebbutt || F. B. Zoltowski || EUN || align=right | 2.0 km || 
|-id=849 bgcolor=#E9E9E9
| 257849 ||  || — || July 2, 2000 || Kitt Peak || Spacewatch || — || align=right | 1.2 km || 
|-id=850 bgcolor=#E9E9E9
| 257850 ||  || — || July 4, 2000 || Kitt Peak || Spacewatch || GEF || align=right | 1.7 km || 
|-id=851 bgcolor=#FA8072
| 257851 ||  || — || July 23, 2000 || Socorro || LINEAR || — || align=right data-sort-value="0.91" | 910 m || 
|-id=852 bgcolor=#E9E9E9
| 257852 ||  || — || July 24, 2000 || Socorro || LINEAR || — || align=right | 4.7 km || 
|-id=853 bgcolor=#E9E9E9
| 257853 ||  || — || July 29, 2000 || Anderson Mesa || LONEOS || CLO || align=right | 3.7 km || 
|-id=854 bgcolor=#E9E9E9
| 257854 ||  || — || August 4, 2000 || Socorro || LINEAR || — || align=right | 3.9 km || 
|-id=855 bgcolor=#E9E9E9
| 257855 ||  || — || August 29, 2000 || Socorro || LINEAR || DOR || align=right | 3.6 km || 
|-id=856 bgcolor=#E9E9E9
| 257856 ||  || — || August 27, 2000 || Kvistaberg || UDAS || DOR || align=right | 3.0 km || 
|-id=857 bgcolor=#E9E9E9
| 257857 ||  || — || August 31, 2000 || Socorro || LINEAR || CLO || align=right | 3.8 km || 
|-id=858 bgcolor=#fefefe
| 257858 ||  || — || August 31, 2000 || Socorro || LINEAR || — || align=right data-sort-value="0.98" | 980 m || 
|-id=859 bgcolor=#fefefe
| 257859 ||  || — || August 26, 2000 || Socorro || LINEAR || V || align=right data-sort-value="0.89" | 890 m || 
|-id=860 bgcolor=#fefefe
| 257860 ||  || — || August 31, 2000 || Socorro || LINEAR || V || align=right data-sort-value="0.99" | 990 m || 
|-id=861 bgcolor=#fefefe
| 257861 ||  || — || August 27, 2000 || Cerro Tololo || M. W. Buie || — || align=right data-sort-value="0.74" | 740 m || 
|-id=862 bgcolor=#fefefe
| 257862 ||  || — || August 28, 2000 || Cerro Tololo || M. W. Buie || — || align=right data-sort-value="0.83" | 830 m || 
|-id=863 bgcolor=#E9E9E9
| 257863 ||  || — || September 1, 2000 || Socorro || LINEAR || — || align=right | 3.9 km || 
|-id=864 bgcolor=#E9E9E9
| 257864 ||  || — || September 2, 2000 || Socorro || LINEAR || GEF || align=right | 2.4 km || 
|-id=865 bgcolor=#fefefe
| 257865 ||  || — || September 2, 2000 || Anderson Mesa || LONEOS || — || align=right data-sort-value="0.85" | 850 m || 
|-id=866 bgcolor=#E9E9E9
| 257866 ||  || — || September 23, 2000 || Socorro || LINEAR || — || align=right | 4.6 km || 
|-id=867 bgcolor=#d6d6d6
| 257867 ||  || — || September 23, 2000 || Socorro || LINEAR || — || align=right | 4.0 km || 
|-id=868 bgcolor=#E9E9E9
| 257868 ||  || — || September 24, 2000 || Socorro || LINEAR || — || align=right | 3.9 km || 
|-id=869 bgcolor=#fefefe
| 257869 ||  || — || September 24, 2000 || Socorro || LINEAR || — || align=right | 1.1 km || 
|-id=870 bgcolor=#fefefe
| 257870 ||  || — || September 24, 2000 || Socorro || LINEAR || — || align=right data-sort-value="0.74" | 740 m || 
|-id=871 bgcolor=#d6d6d6
| 257871 ||  || — || September 26, 2000 || Ondřejov || P. Kušnirák || — || align=right | 4.6 km || 
|-id=872 bgcolor=#E9E9E9
| 257872 ||  || — || September 24, 2000 || Socorro || LINEAR || — || align=right | 3.6 km || 
|-id=873 bgcolor=#E9E9E9
| 257873 ||  || — || September 24, 2000 || Socorro || LINEAR || DOR || align=right | 3.5 km || 
|-id=874 bgcolor=#fefefe
| 257874 ||  || — || September 23, 2000 || Socorro || LINEAR || FLO || align=right data-sort-value="0.73" | 730 m || 
|-id=875 bgcolor=#fefefe
| 257875 ||  || — || September 23, 2000 || Socorro || LINEAR || — || align=right | 1.0 km || 
|-id=876 bgcolor=#E9E9E9
| 257876 ||  || — || September 22, 2000 || Socorro || LINEAR || — || align=right | 3.2 km || 
|-id=877 bgcolor=#d6d6d6
| 257877 ||  || — || September 23, 2000 || Socorro || LINEAR || — || align=right | 5.2 km || 
|-id=878 bgcolor=#E9E9E9
| 257878 ||  || — || September 23, 2000 || Socorro || LINEAR || CLO || align=right | 3.2 km || 
|-id=879 bgcolor=#d6d6d6
| 257879 ||  || — || September 24, 2000 || Socorro || LINEAR || — || align=right | 4.4 km || 
|-id=880 bgcolor=#d6d6d6
| 257880 ||  || — || September 27, 2000 || Socorro || LINEAR || — || align=right | 3.5 km || 
|-id=881 bgcolor=#fefefe
| 257881 ||  || — || September 27, 2000 || Socorro || LINEAR || V || align=right data-sort-value="0.72" | 720 m || 
|-id=882 bgcolor=#d6d6d6
| 257882 ||  || — || September 24, 2000 || Socorro || LINEAR || BRA || align=right | 1.5 km || 
|-id=883 bgcolor=#fefefe
| 257883 ||  || — || September 26, 2000 || Socorro || LINEAR || — || align=right data-sort-value="0.96" | 960 m || 
|-id=884 bgcolor=#d6d6d6
| 257884 ||  || — || September 28, 2000 || Socorro || LINEAR || INA || align=right | 3.8 km || 
|-id=885 bgcolor=#E9E9E9
| 257885 ||  || — || September 24, 2000 || Socorro || LINEAR || — || align=right | 3.3 km || 
|-id=886 bgcolor=#E9E9E9
| 257886 ||  || — || September 25, 2000 || Socorro || LINEAR || — || align=right | 3.2 km || 
|-id=887 bgcolor=#d6d6d6
| 257887 ||  || — || September 23, 2000 || Socorro || LINEAR || SAN || align=right | 2.7 km || 
|-id=888 bgcolor=#fefefe
| 257888 ||  || — || September 27, 2000 || Socorro || LINEAR || — || align=right data-sort-value="0.83" | 830 m || 
|-id=889 bgcolor=#fefefe
| 257889 ||  || — || September 27, 2000 || Socorro || LINEAR || V || align=right data-sort-value="0.81" | 810 m || 
|-id=890 bgcolor=#fefefe
| 257890 ||  || — || September 27, 2000 || Socorro || LINEAR || — || align=right data-sort-value="0.73" | 730 m || 
|-id=891 bgcolor=#d6d6d6
| 257891 ||  || — || September 28, 2000 || Socorro || LINEAR || — || align=right | 3.7 km || 
|-id=892 bgcolor=#fefefe
| 257892 ||  || — || September 25, 2000 || Haleakala || NEAT || — || align=right | 1.0 km || 
|-id=893 bgcolor=#fefefe
| 257893 ||  || — || September 24, 2000 || Socorro || LINEAR || — || align=right data-sort-value="0.93" | 930 m || 
|-id=894 bgcolor=#fefefe
| 257894 ||  || — || September 29, 2000 || Anderson Mesa || LONEOS || — || align=right | 1.1 km || 
|-id=895 bgcolor=#fefefe
| 257895 ||  || — || September 24, 2000 || Anderson Mesa || LONEOS || — || align=right | 1.1 km || 
|-id=896 bgcolor=#d6d6d6
| 257896 ||  || — || October 1, 2000 || Socorro || LINEAR || KOR || align=right | 2.0 km || 
|-id=897 bgcolor=#E9E9E9
| 257897 ||  || — || October 1, 2000 || Socorro || LINEAR || — || align=right | 2.9 km || 
|-id=898 bgcolor=#fefefe
| 257898 ||  || — || October 2, 2000 || Socorro || LINEAR || — || align=right data-sort-value="0.89" | 890 m || 
|-id=899 bgcolor=#C2FFFF
| 257899 ||  || — || October 3, 2000 || Socorro || LINEAR || L5 || align=right | 13 km || 
|-id=900 bgcolor=#d6d6d6
| 257900 ||  || — || October 4, 2000 || Bergisch Gladbac || W. Bickel || — || align=right | 3.1 km || 
|}

257901–258000 

|-bgcolor=#fefefe
| 257901 ||  || — || October 1, 2000 || Socorro || LINEAR || — || align=right | 1.0 km || 
|-id=902 bgcolor=#fefefe
| 257902 ||  || — || October 1, 2000 || Socorro || LINEAR || — || align=right | 1.1 km || 
|-id=903 bgcolor=#fefefe
| 257903 ||  || — || October 1, 2000 || Socorro || LINEAR || — || align=right | 1.0 km || 
|-id=904 bgcolor=#fefefe
| 257904 ||  || — || October 24, 2000 || Socorro || LINEAR || FLO || align=right data-sort-value="0.91" | 910 m || 
|-id=905 bgcolor=#fefefe
| 257905 ||  || — || October 24, 2000 || Socorro || LINEAR || FLO || align=right | 1.0 km || 
|-id=906 bgcolor=#d6d6d6
| 257906 ||  || — || October 25, 2000 || Socorro || LINEAR || — || align=right | 4.7 km || 
|-id=907 bgcolor=#FA8072
| 257907 ||  || — || October 24, 2000 || Socorro || LINEAR || H || align=right data-sort-value="0.96" | 960 m || 
|-id=908 bgcolor=#d6d6d6
| 257908 ||  || — || October 31, 2000 || Socorro || LINEAR || CHA || align=right | 3.0 km || 
|-id=909 bgcolor=#d6d6d6
| 257909 ||  || — || October 25, 2000 || Socorro || LINEAR || — || align=right | 6.4 km || 
|-id=910 bgcolor=#d6d6d6
| 257910 ||  || — || October 29, 2000 || Socorro || LINEAR || — || align=right | 3.1 km || 
|-id=911 bgcolor=#fefefe
| 257911 ||  || — || November 1, 2000 || Socorro || LINEAR || PHO || align=right | 2.0 km || 
|-id=912 bgcolor=#d6d6d6
| 257912 ||  || — || November 1, 2000 || Socorro || LINEAR || — || align=right | 4.5 km || 
|-id=913 bgcolor=#d6d6d6
| 257913 ||  || — || November 1, 2000 || Socorro || LINEAR || — || align=right | 3.7 km || 
|-id=914 bgcolor=#fefefe
| 257914 ||  || — || November 1, 2000 || Socorro || LINEAR || FLO || align=right data-sort-value="0.89" | 890 m || 
|-id=915 bgcolor=#fefefe
| 257915 ||  || — || November 2, 2000 || Socorro || LINEAR || FLO || align=right data-sort-value="0.99" | 990 m || 
|-id=916 bgcolor=#d6d6d6
| 257916 ||  || — || November 3, 2000 || Socorro || LINEAR || MEL || align=right | 5.8 km || 
|-id=917 bgcolor=#fefefe
| 257917 ||  || — || November 3, 2000 || Socorro || LINEAR || V || align=right data-sort-value="0.86" | 860 m || 
|-id=918 bgcolor=#d6d6d6
| 257918 ||  || — || November 16, 2000 || Socorro || LINEAR || EUP || align=right | 5.9 km || 
|-id=919 bgcolor=#fefefe
| 257919 ||  || — || November 20, 2000 || Socorro || LINEAR || H || align=right data-sort-value="0.83" | 830 m || 
|-id=920 bgcolor=#d6d6d6
| 257920 ||  || — || November 25, 2000 || Kitt Peak || Spacewatch || — || align=right | 2.4 km || 
|-id=921 bgcolor=#FA8072
| 257921 ||  || — || November 26, 2000 || Socorro || LINEAR || H || align=right data-sort-value="0.79" | 790 m || 
|-id=922 bgcolor=#fefefe
| 257922 ||  || — || November 20, 2000 || Socorro || LINEAR || — || align=right data-sort-value="0.99" | 990 m || 
|-id=923 bgcolor=#d6d6d6
| 257923 ||  || — || November 20, 2000 || Socorro || LINEAR || TRP || align=right | 3.9 km || 
|-id=924 bgcolor=#FA8072
| 257924 ||  || — || November 29, 2000 || Kitt Peak || Spacewatch || — || align=right data-sort-value="0.76" | 760 m || 
|-id=925 bgcolor=#d6d6d6
| 257925 ||  || — || November 29, 2000 || Haleakala || NEAT || TIR || align=right | 4.9 km || 
|-id=926 bgcolor=#FA8072
| 257926 ||  || — || November 20, 2000 || Socorro || LINEAR || — || align=right | 1.3 km || 
|-id=927 bgcolor=#d6d6d6
| 257927 ||  || — || November 20, 2000 || Socorro || LINEAR || — || align=right | 4.2 km || 
|-id=928 bgcolor=#fefefe
| 257928 ||  || — || November 21, 2000 || Socorro || LINEAR || — || align=right | 1.2 km || 
|-id=929 bgcolor=#d6d6d6
| 257929 ||  || — || November 18, 2000 || Kitt Peak || Spacewatch || — || align=right | 2.3 km || 
|-id=930 bgcolor=#d6d6d6
| 257930 ||  || — || November 19, 2000 || Socorro || LINEAR || ALA || align=right | 5.9 km || 
|-id=931 bgcolor=#d6d6d6
| 257931 ||  || — || November 29, 2000 || Socorro || LINEAR || — || align=right | 4.2 km || 
|-id=932 bgcolor=#d6d6d6
| 257932 ||  || — || November 30, 2000 || Socorro || LINEAR || — || align=right | 4.3 km || 
|-id=933 bgcolor=#fefefe
| 257933 ||  || — || November 20, 2000 || Anderson Mesa || LONEOS || FLO || align=right data-sort-value="0.68" | 680 m || 
|-id=934 bgcolor=#fefefe
| 257934 ||  || — || November 26, 2000 || Kitt Peak || Spacewatch || — || align=right | 1.1 km || 
|-id=935 bgcolor=#d6d6d6
| 257935 ||  || — || November 25, 2000 || Socorro || LINEAR || — || align=right | 7.1 km || 
|-id=936 bgcolor=#d6d6d6
| 257936 ||  || — || November 26, 2000 || Anderson Mesa || LONEOS || — || align=right | 6.2 km || 
|-id=937 bgcolor=#d6d6d6
| 257937 ||  || — || November 30, 2000 || Anderson Mesa || LONEOS || — || align=right | 5.0 km || 
|-id=938 bgcolor=#d6d6d6
| 257938 ||  || — || November 30, 2000 || Kitt Peak || Spacewatch || — || align=right | 3.8 km || 
|-id=939 bgcolor=#E9E9E9
| 257939 ||  || — || November 29, 2000 || Socorro || LINEAR || — || align=right | 3.6 km || 
|-id=940 bgcolor=#fefefe
| 257940 ||  || — || November 29, 2000 || Socorro || LINEAR || H || align=right data-sort-value="0.92" | 920 m || 
|-id=941 bgcolor=#fefefe
| 257941 ||  || — || December 1, 2000 || Socorro || LINEAR || PHO || align=right | 1.7 km || 
|-id=942 bgcolor=#fefefe
| 257942 ||  || — || December 4, 2000 || Prescott || P. G. Comba || — || align=right data-sort-value="0.80" | 800 m || 
|-id=943 bgcolor=#d6d6d6
| 257943 ||  || — || December 4, 2000 || Socorro || LINEAR || DUR || align=right | 5.2 km || 
|-id=944 bgcolor=#fefefe
| 257944 ||  || — || December 14, 2000 || Bohyunsan || Bohyunsan Obs. || — || align=right | 1.1 km || 
|-id=945 bgcolor=#d6d6d6
| 257945 ||  || — || December 22, 2000 || Ondřejov || P. Kušnirák || — || align=right | 4.9 km || 
|-id=946 bgcolor=#C2FFFF
| 257946 ||  || — || December 23, 2000 || Kitt Peak || Spacewatch || L4 || align=right | 16 km || 
|-id=947 bgcolor=#d6d6d6
| 257947 ||  || — || December 30, 2000 || Kitt Peak || Spacewatch || THM || align=right | 2.4 km || 
|-id=948 bgcolor=#fefefe
| 257948 ||  || — || December 26, 2000 || Haleakala || NEAT || PHO || align=right | 1.5 km || 
|-id=949 bgcolor=#d6d6d6
| 257949 ||  || — || December 30, 2000 || Socorro || LINEAR || — || align=right | 3.9 km || 
|-id=950 bgcolor=#fefefe
| 257950 ||  || — || December 30, 2000 || Socorro || LINEAR || NYS || align=right data-sort-value="0.98" | 980 m || 
|-id=951 bgcolor=#d6d6d6
| 257951 ||  || — || December 30, 2000 || Socorro || LINEAR || — || align=right | 6.0 km || 
|-id=952 bgcolor=#fefefe
| 257952 ||  || — || December 30, 2000 || Socorro || LINEAR || V || align=right | 1.1 km || 
|-id=953 bgcolor=#fefefe
| 257953 ||  || — || December 17, 2000 || Kitt Peak || Spacewatch || — || align=right | 1.3 km || 
|-id=954 bgcolor=#fefefe
| 257954 ||  || — || December 20, 2000 || Kitt Peak || DLS || V || align=right data-sort-value="0.74" | 740 m || 
|-id=955 bgcolor=#fefefe
| 257955 ||  || — || January 2, 2001 || Socorro || LINEAR || — || align=right | 1.2 km || 
|-id=956 bgcolor=#d6d6d6
| 257956 ||  || — || January 3, 2001 || Socorro || LINEAR || IMH || align=right | 6.5 km || 
|-id=957 bgcolor=#fefefe
| 257957 ||  || — || January 7, 2001 || Socorro || LINEAR || PHO || align=right | 1.2 km || 
|-id=958 bgcolor=#d6d6d6
| 257958 ||  || — || January 15, 2001 || Kitt Peak || Spacewatch || — || align=right | 4.1 km || 
|-id=959 bgcolor=#d6d6d6
| 257959 ||  || — || January 19, 2001 || Socorro || LINEAR || EOS || align=right | 2.6 km || 
|-id=960 bgcolor=#d6d6d6
| 257960 ||  || — || January 18, 2001 || Socorro || LINEAR || IMH || align=right | 5.1 km || 
|-id=961 bgcolor=#d6d6d6
| 257961 ||  || — || January 20, 2001 || Socorro || LINEAR || — || align=right | 6.0 km || 
|-id=962 bgcolor=#fefefe
| 257962 ||  || — || January 16, 2001 || Kitt Peak || Spacewatch || NYS || align=right | 1.00 km || 
|-id=963 bgcolor=#d6d6d6
| 257963 ||  || — || January 19, 2001 || Socorro || LINEAR || — || align=right | 4.1 km || 
|-id=964 bgcolor=#fefefe
| 257964 ||  || — || January 30, 2001 || Junk Bond || Junk Bond Obs. || — || align=right | 1.0 km || 
|-id=965 bgcolor=#fefefe
| 257965 ||  || — || January 26, 2001 || Kitt Peak || Spacewatch || NYS || align=right data-sort-value="0.97" | 970 m || 
|-id=966 bgcolor=#d6d6d6
| 257966 ||  || — || February 1, 2001 || Socorro || LINEAR || — || align=right | 6.1 km || 
|-id=967 bgcolor=#C2FFFF
| 257967 ||  || — || February 1, 2001 || Socorro || LINEAR || L4 || align=right | 14 km || 
|-id=968 bgcolor=#d6d6d6
| 257968 ||  || — || February 1, 2001 || Socorro || LINEAR || LIX || align=right | 5.4 km || 
|-id=969 bgcolor=#d6d6d6
| 257969 ||  || — || February 1, 2001 || Socorro || LINEAR || — || align=right | 4.1 km || 
|-id=970 bgcolor=#d6d6d6
| 257970 ||  || — || February 5, 2001 || Socorro || LINEAR || EUP || align=right | 5.6 km || 
|-id=971 bgcolor=#d6d6d6
| 257971 ||  || — || February 13, 2001 || Socorro || LINEAR || TIR || align=right | 4.3 km || 
|-id=972 bgcolor=#d6d6d6
| 257972 ||  || — || February 13, 2001 || Socorro || LINEAR || EUP || align=right | 5.3 km || 
|-id=973 bgcolor=#d6d6d6
| 257973 ||  || — || February 13, 2001 || Kitt Peak || Spacewatch || — || align=right | 4.0 km || 
|-id=974 bgcolor=#fefefe
| 257974 ||  || — || February 15, 2001 || Socorro || LINEAR || H || align=right data-sort-value="0.73" | 730 m || 
|-id=975 bgcolor=#d6d6d6
| 257975 ||  || — || February 15, 2001 || Socorro || LINEAR || — || align=right | 4.5 km || 
|-id=976 bgcolor=#d6d6d6
| 257976 ||  || — || February 12, 2001 || Anderson Mesa || LONEOS || — || align=right | 3.7 km || 
|-id=977 bgcolor=#d6d6d6
| 257977 ||  || — || February 15, 2001 || Socorro || LINEAR || — || align=right | 4.7 km || 
|-id=978 bgcolor=#d6d6d6
| 257978 ||  || — || February 13, 2001 || Kitt Peak || Spacewatch || — || align=right | 3.5 km || 
|-id=979 bgcolor=#d6d6d6
| 257979 ||  || — || February 16, 2001 || Socorro || LINEAR || TIR || align=right | 5.4 km || 
|-id=980 bgcolor=#fefefe
| 257980 ||  || — || February 16, 2001 || Socorro || LINEAR || — || align=right | 1.2 km || 
|-id=981 bgcolor=#fefefe
| 257981 ||  || — || February 16, 2001 || Socorro || LINEAR || — || align=right | 1.4 km || 
|-id=982 bgcolor=#d6d6d6
| 257982 ||  || — || February 16, 2001 || Socorro || LINEAR || — || align=right | 4.9 km || 
|-id=983 bgcolor=#E9E9E9
| 257983 ||  || — || February 17, 2001 || Socorro || LINEAR || — || align=right | 1.3 km || 
|-id=984 bgcolor=#fefefe
| 257984 ||  || — || February 17, 2001 || Socorro || LINEAR || — || align=right | 1.2 km || 
|-id=985 bgcolor=#d6d6d6
| 257985 ||  || — || February 18, 2001 || Needville || W. G. Dillon || — || align=right | 3.5 km || 
|-id=986 bgcolor=#d6d6d6
| 257986 ||  || — || February 19, 2001 || Socorro || LINEAR || 7:4 || align=right | 5.1 km || 
|-id=987 bgcolor=#C2FFFF
| 257987 ||  || — || February 22, 2001 || Kitt Peak || Spacewatch || L4 || align=right | 10 km || 
|-id=988 bgcolor=#fefefe
| 257988 ||  || — || February 20, 2001 || Haleakala || NEAT || — || align=right | 1.1 km || 
|-id=989 bgcolor=#d6d6d6
| 257989 ||  || — || February 21, 2001 || Kitt Peak || Spacewatch || — || align=right | 3.0 km || 
|-id=990 bgcolor=#fefefe
| 257990 ||  || — || February 21, 2001 || Kitt Peak || Spacewatch || MAS || align=right data-sort-value="0.92" | 920 m || 
|-id=991 bgcolor=#fefefe
| 257991 ||  || — || February 22, 2001 || Kitt Peak || Spacewatch || — || align=right data-sort-value="0.86" | 860 m || 
|-id=992 bgcolor=#fefefe
| 257992 ||  || — || February 17, 2001 || Socorro || LINEAR || NYS || align=right data-sort-value="0.81" | 810 m || 
|-id=993 bgcolor=#d6d6d6
| 257993 ||  || — || February 17, 2001 || Socorro || LINEAR || — || align=right | 5.3 km || 
|-id=994 bgcolor=#d6d6d6
| 257994 ||  || — || February 18, 2001 || Haleakala || NEAT || — || align=right | 4.9 km || 
|-id=995 bgcolor=#d6d6d6
| 257995 ||  || — || March 1, 2001 || Socorro || LINEAR || — || align=right | 5.3 km || 
|-id=996 bgcolor=#d6d6d6
| 257996 ||  || — || March 2, 2001 || Anderson Mesa || LONEOS || — || align=right | 3.8 km || 
|-id=997 bgcolor=#fefefe
| 257997 ||  || — || March 2, 2001 || Anderson Mesa || LONEOS || — || align=right | 1.2 km || 
|-id=998 bgcolor=#fefefe
| 257998 ||  || — || March 2, 2001 || Anderson Mesa || LONEOS || — || align=right | 1.0 km || 
|-id=999 bgcolor=#fefefe
| 257999 ||  || — || March 2, 2001 || Haleakala || NEAT || — || align=right | 1.2 km || 
|-id=000 bgcolor=#fefefe
| 258000 ||  || — || March 15, 2001 || Haleakala || NEAT || — || align=right | 1.5 km || 
|}

References

External links 
 Discovery Circumstances: Numbered Minor Planets (255001)–(260000) (IAU Minor Planet Center)

0257